= Bastille Day military parade =

French parades held on 14 July

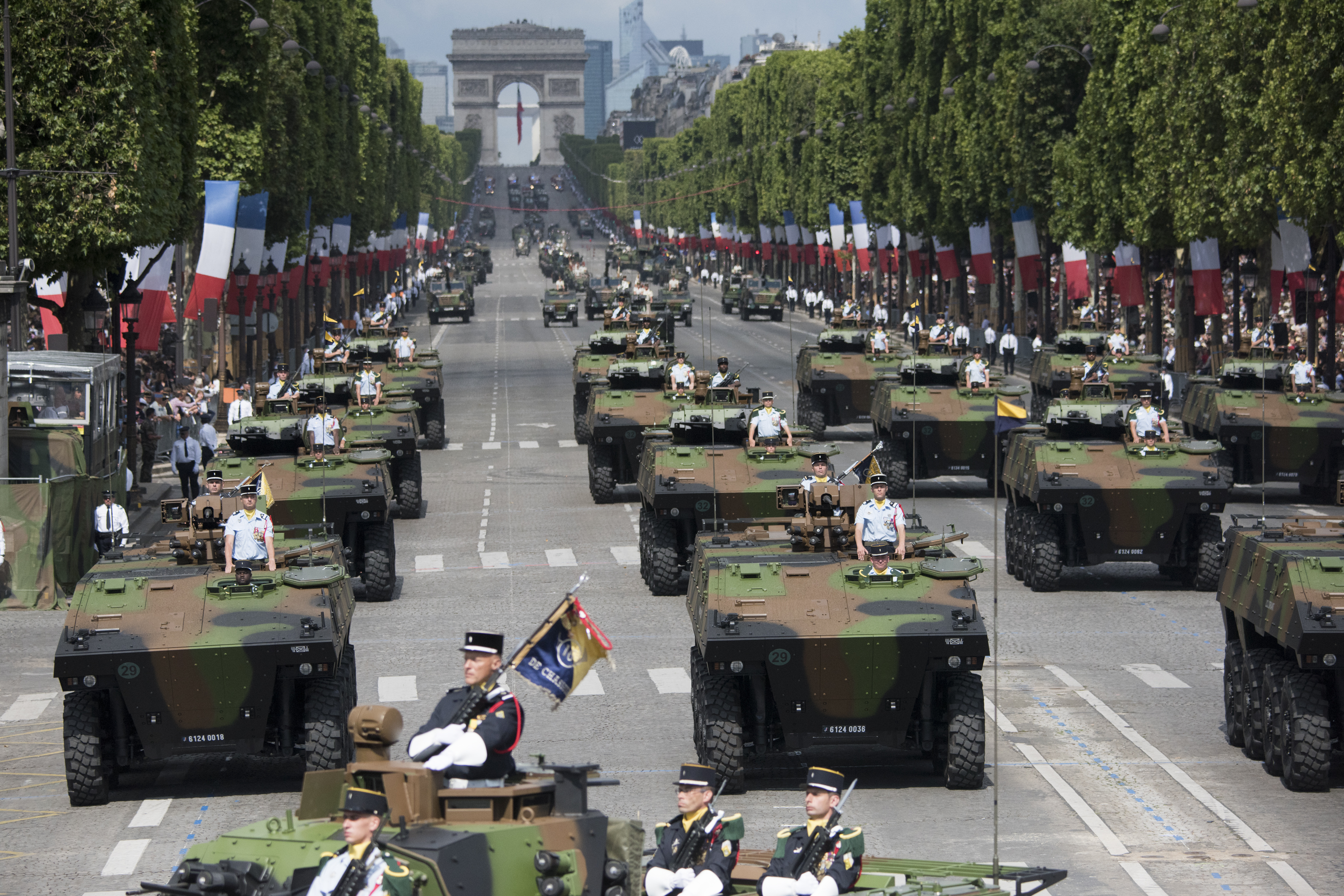
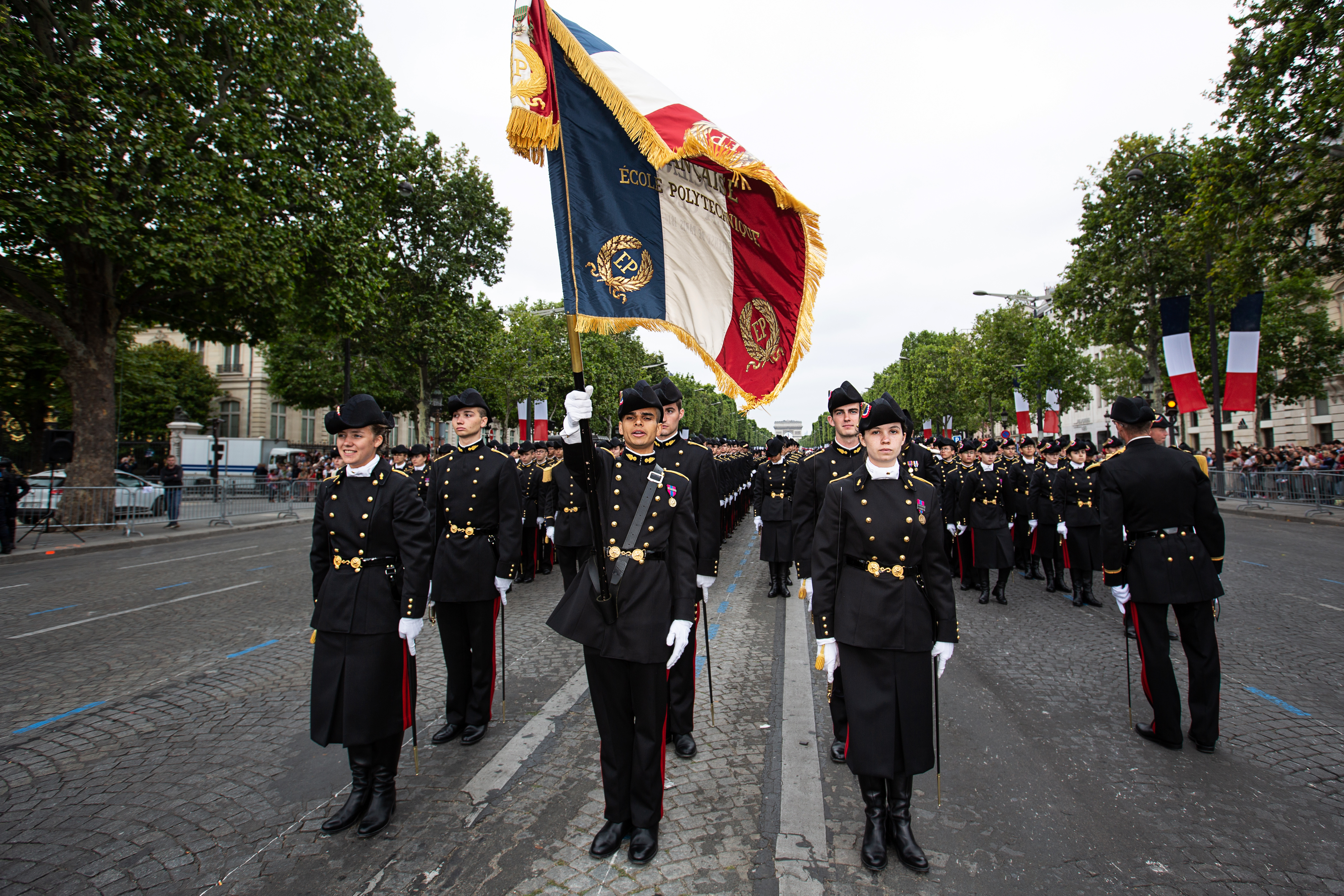
- The parade on the Champs-Élysées
- Official name: Défilé du 14 juillet
- Observed by: France
- Celebrations: Military parade
- Begins: 1880
- Date: 14 July
- Next time: 14 July 2027
- Frequency: Annual
- Related to: Bastille Day

The Bastille Day military parade, also known as the 14 July military parade, translation of the French name of Défilé militaire du 14 juillet, is a French military parade that has been held on the morning of Bastille Day, 14 July, each year in Paris since 1880, almost without exception. The parade passes down the Avenue des Champs-Élysées from Place Charles de Gaulle, centred around the Arc de Triomphe, to the Place de la Concorde, where the President stands, along with members of the Government, figures from the legislative branch, the Mayor of Paris, as well as foreign ambassadors to France.

It is a popular event in France, broadcast live on television; it is also one of the oldest regular military parades in the world. In some years, invited detachments of foreign troops take part in the parade and foreign statesmen attend as guests. Smaller military parades are held in French garrison cities, most notably Marseille, Toulon, Brest, Rochefort, Belfort, and Nice.

== Organisation and parade summary ==
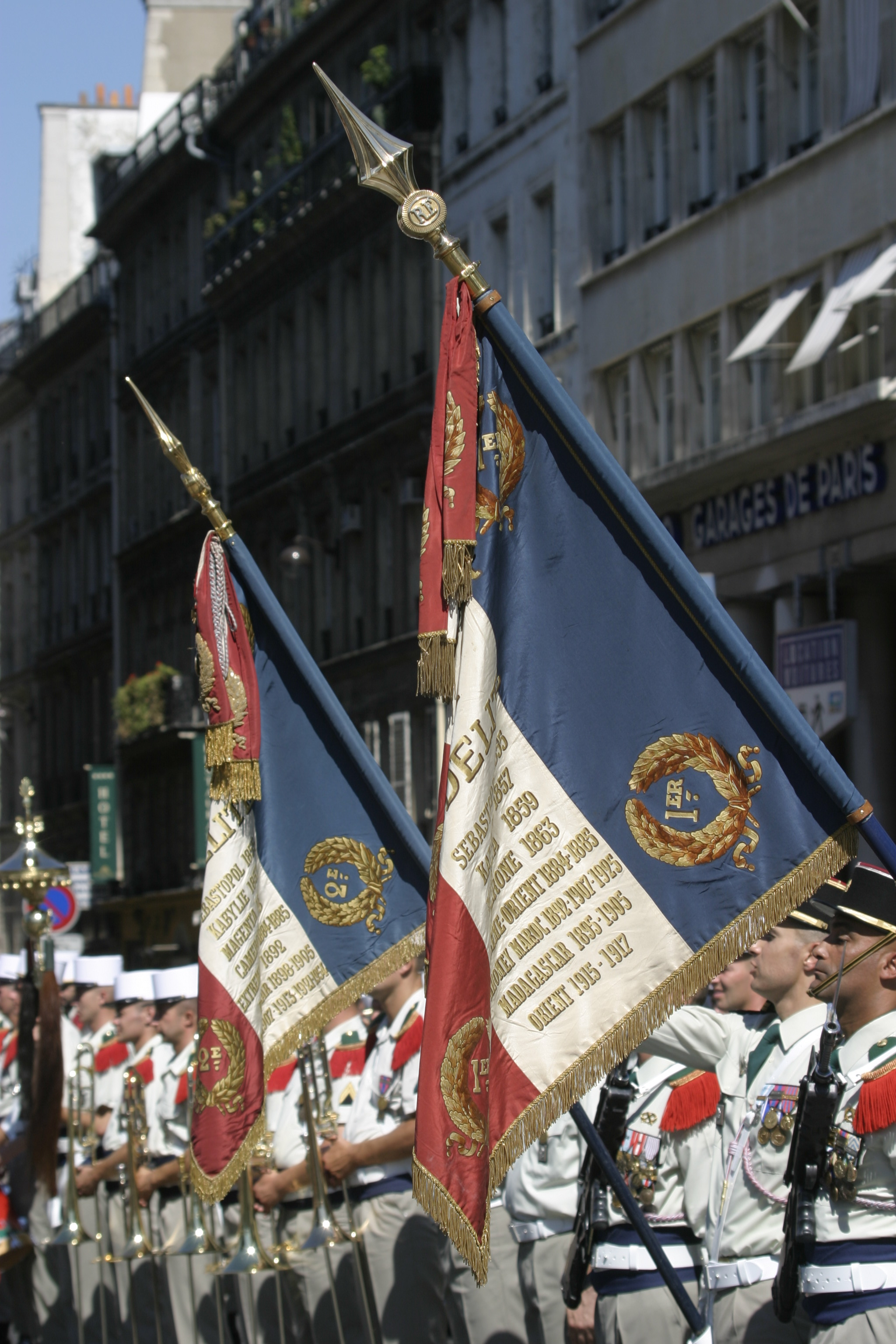
The Foreign Legion

As the President of France arrives via a convoy of the Republican Guard to the Arc de Triomphe, he is greeted by the parade commander, who informs him that the parade is now ready for inspection. He then rides the Chief of Defense Staff's vehicle to inspect the troops on the Champs-Elysées escorted by troopers and officers of the Republican Guard's cavalry regiment and its mounted band, waving on the crowds lining up on the boulevard. After he disembarks from the vehicle he finishes the inspection through one done for the Republican Guard Infantry units, then walks to the stage on the Place de la Concorde to meet the dignitaries present.

In recent years the parade has started with military bands from the French Armed Forces taking the stage with band exhibitions and drill shows, sometimes including displays from foreign service troops and mounted units; plus military and civil choirs singing classic French patriotic songs. This opening ends with the playing of La Marseillaise, the National Anthem of France.

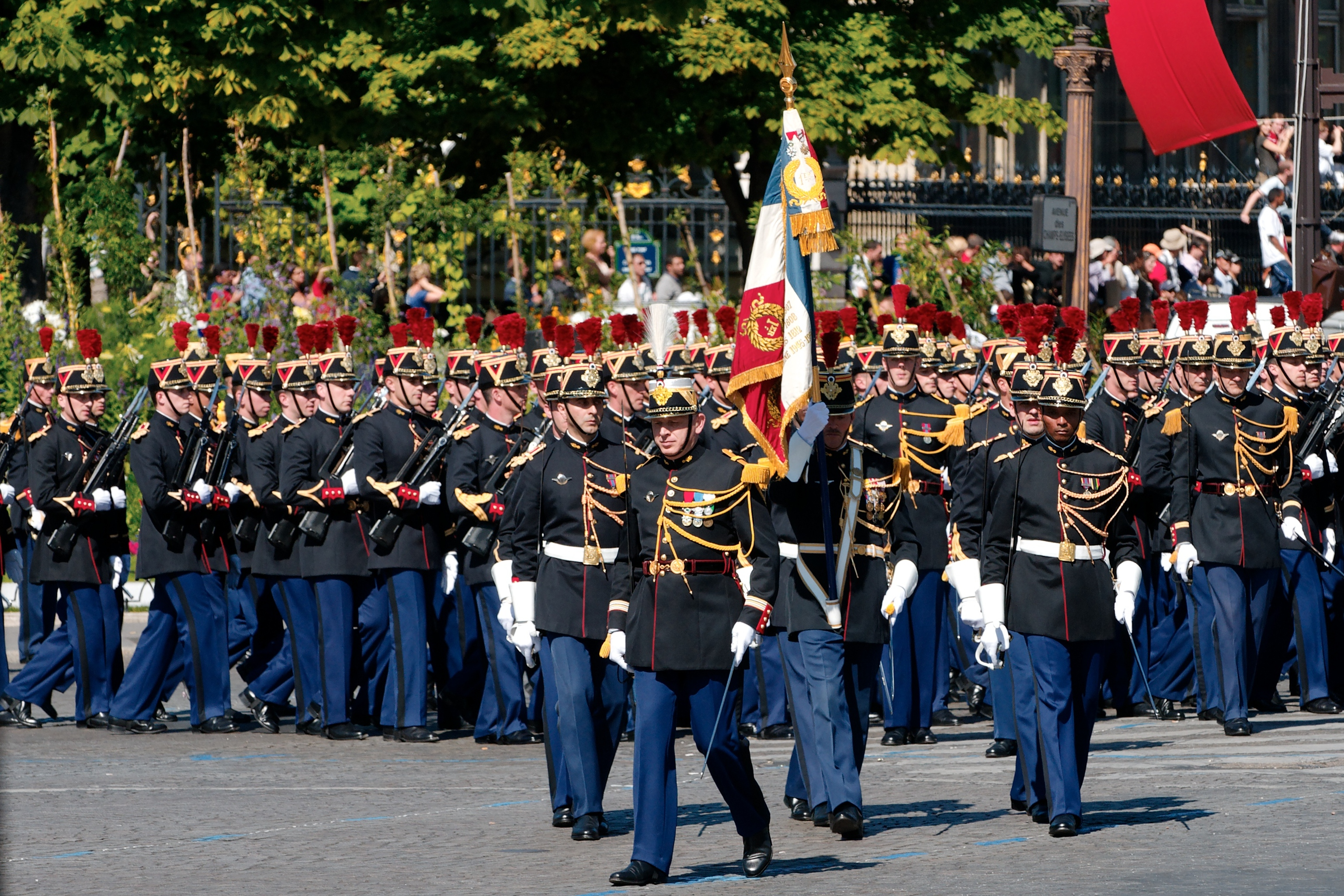
The 1st infantry regiment of the Republican Guard

The parade opens with cadets from the military schools in order of seniority: the École Polytechnique, the Saint-Cyr and the École Navale, followed by newer academies. Competition between those schools often led to some practical pranks: Polytechnique is a highly selective engineer school, considered as the most difficult in France, whose students reverse most of the time to civilian occupation while Saint Cyr is a professional officer school. As a consequence, students from the first have occasionally "mined" the path for their colleagues using sticky or slippery products.

The Patrouille de France leads the fly-past of the French Air Force and Naval Aviation.

Recently, it has become customary to invite units from France's close allies to participate in the parade. For instance, in 2004, to mark the centenary of the Entente Cordiale, British troops (the band of the Royal Marines, the Household Cavalry Mounted Regiment, Grenadier Guards and King's Troop, Royal Horse Artillery) led the Bastille Day parade in Paris, with the Red Arrows flying overhead. While British troops had participated in the Bastille Day parades of 14 July 1919 and 1939 (see below), this was the first occasion that invited foreign troops had actually led the parade. In 2007, the parade opened with detachments from all member states of the European Union, flying the European flag. The European anthem was played.

The parade follows with foot soldiers: army infantry; troupes de Marine; Air; Gendarmerie Nationale, including the Republican Guard; and occasionally non-military police and fire units. The French Foreign Legion always brings up the rear of this part of the parade, because their ceremonial marching pace is slower than that of other French infantry units. It is the only participant that does not split up when passing by the officials and the army headquarters' tribune.

Motorised and armoured troops come next, and the parade traditionally ends with the popular Paris Fire Brigade, which is a military unit in the French Army. At the same time, above the Champs-Elysées, the flypast continues with French Air Force and Naval Air Force planes and helicopters, and aircraft from the National Gendarmerie, the Interior Ministry's Civil Security Air Service and the various fire-fighting units nationwide. The parade ends with a parachute display by selected parachutists from the French Armed Forces. 2011's finale saw a gymnastic exhibition and fire truck demonstration by Paris Fire Brigade personnel.

== History ==
=== Early years ===
Originally a popular feast, Bastille Day became militarised during the Directory. Under Napoleon, the celebration lost much of its importance, though it came back into fashion during the Third Republic. The Fourteenth of July became the official national celebration on 28 June 1880, and a decree of 6 July the same year linked a military parade to it. Between 1880 and 1914 the celebrations were held at the Longchamp Racecourse in the Bois de Boulogne, Paris.

Since World War I the parade has been held on the Champs-Élysées, the first occasion being the défilé de la Victoire ("Victory parade") led by Marshals Joseph Joffre, Ferdinand Foch and Philippe Pétain on 14 July 1919. This was not however a French National Holiday parade, although held upon the same date, but one agreed upon by the Allied delegations to the Versailles Peace Conference. A separate victory parade of Allied troops was held in London four days later.

=== After World War I ===
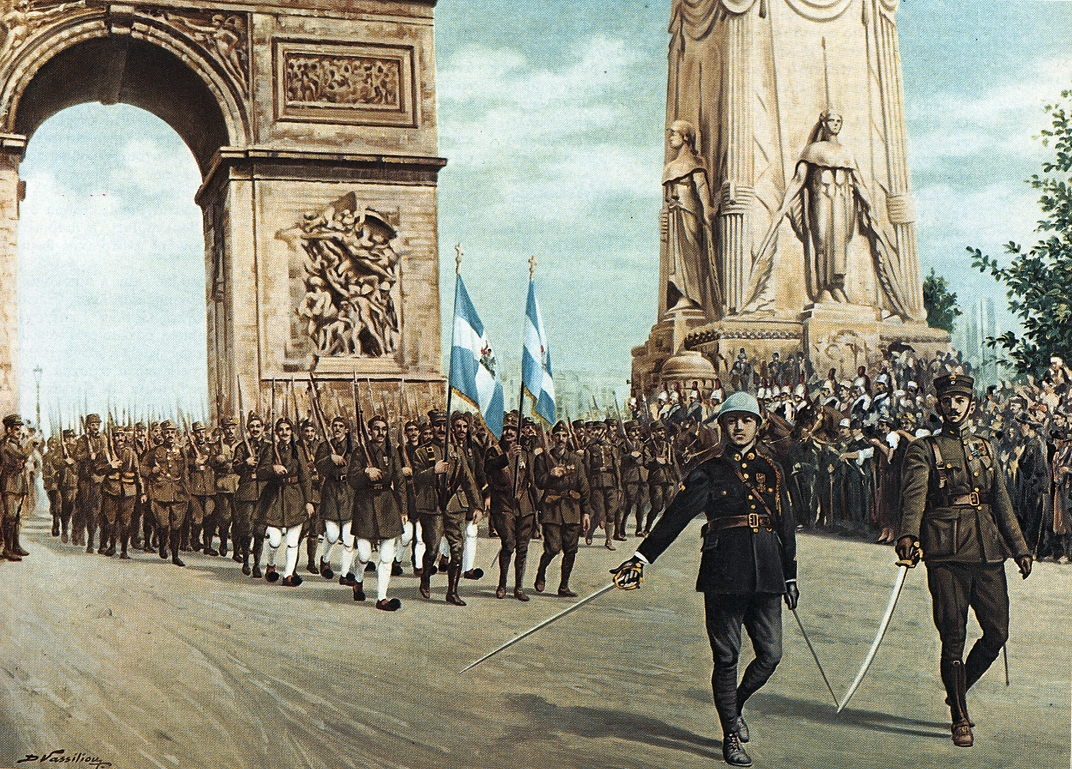
Greek soldiers at the World War I victory parade on 14 July 1919. The temporary catafalque erected at the time is visible to the right of the Arc de Triomphe.

On the occasion of 14 July 1919 parade in Paris, detachments from all of France's World War I allies took part in the parade, together with colonial and North African units from France's overseas empire. The latter, most notably squadrons of Algerian Spahis mounted on Arab horses and in traditional full dress uniform, continued to participate in the annual parade until the end of the Algerian War in 1962.

In the Second World War, the German troops occupying Paris and Northern France paraded along the same route. A victory parade under General de Gaulle was held upon the restoration in 1945 of Paris to French rule while within the period of occupation by the Germans a company of the commando Kieffer of the Forces Navales Françaises Libres had continued the French National Holiday parade in the streets of London.

=== Recent developments ===
In 1971, female personnel were included for the first time amongst the troops parading.

Under Valéry Giscard d'Estaing the parade route was changed each year with troops marching down from the Place de la Bastille to the Place de la République to commemorate popular outbreaks of the French Revolution:

- 1974: Bastille-République (No mobile column and flypast that year, only the mounted and ground columns.)
- 1975: Cours de Vincennes
- 1976: Champs-Élysées
- 1977: École militaire
- 1978: Champs-Élysées
- 1979: République-Bastille
- 1980: Champs-Élysées

Under Presidents François Mitterrand and Jacques Chirac the parade route returned to the Champs-Elysées where it continues to be held. 1989's parade was one of the biggest, which would mark the bicentennial year since the outbreaks of the Revolution in Paris. In 1994, troops of the Eurocorps, including German soldiers, paraded on the invitation of François Mitterrand. The event was seen as symbolic of both European integration, and German-French reconciliation. In 1999, for the "Year of Morocco" in France, the Moroccan Royal Guard opened the parade, in the presence of King Hassan II of Morocco.

In 2002, the cadets of the United States Military Academy and surviving FDNY firefighters paraded. In 2004, British troops from the 1st Battalion, Grenadier Guards, paraded to celebrate the centenary of the Entente cordiale. On an earlier occasion detachments of the British Brigade of Guards and Royal Marines had participated in the Bastille Day Parade of 14 July 1939, shortly before the outbreak of World War II.

In 2005, "year of Brazil" in France, two Brazilian units opened the parade and the smoke squadron (a Brazilian air demonstration squadron) ended the fly-past in the presence of President Lula. In 2007, president Nicolas Sarkozy invited all the 26 other EU member states to join the parade with a detachment of their armed services.

2008's Bastille Day Parade saw a United Nations Security Council/Secretariat-DPKO battalion leading the parade march past from UNDOF, UNFICYP and UNIFIL. In 2009, the parade opened with a contingent of Indian troops drawn from the three services (Indian Army, Indian Navy & Indian Air Force. President Nicolas Sarkozy invited Indian Prime Minister Manmohan Singh, to attend the event as the guest of honour. Soldiers including Jawans of Maratha Light Infantry Regiment Centre (MLIRC) marched down the Champs Elysees to the sound of an Indian military band playing Indian martial tunes including Sare Jahan Se Accha, Haste Lushai and Qadam Qadam Badhaye Ja.

To celebrate 50 years of independence of the French African colonies, the 2010 parade saw troops from several former French African colonies' armed forces lead the parade.

The 2011 parade celebrated the French overseas possessions and the 200 years of the French firefighting service. That same year, former judge and Green politician Eva Joly called for an end to 14 July parade practice, saying that it should be replaced with a "citizens' parade".

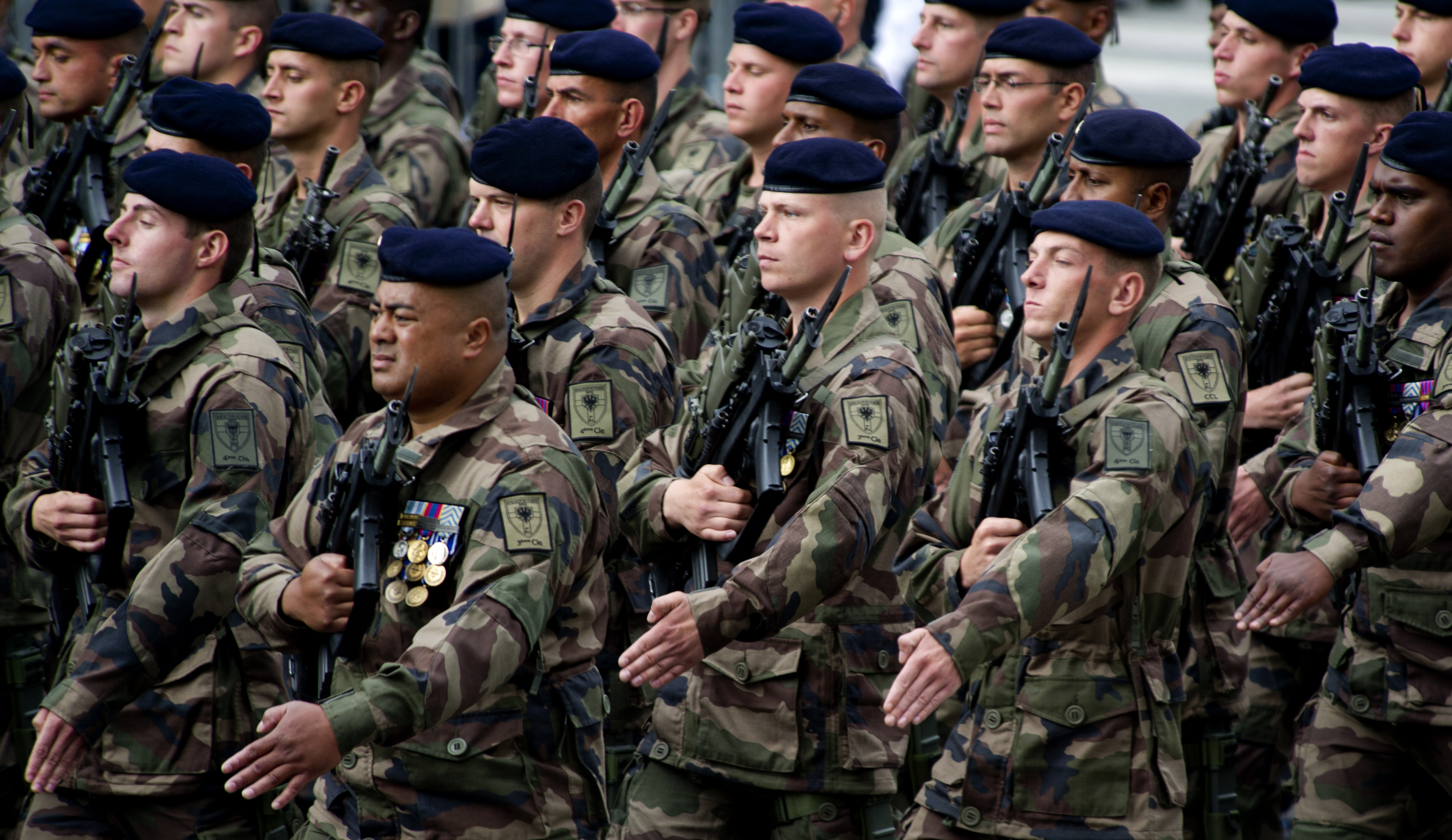
Soldiers of the 1st French Infantry Regiment in Paris in 2012

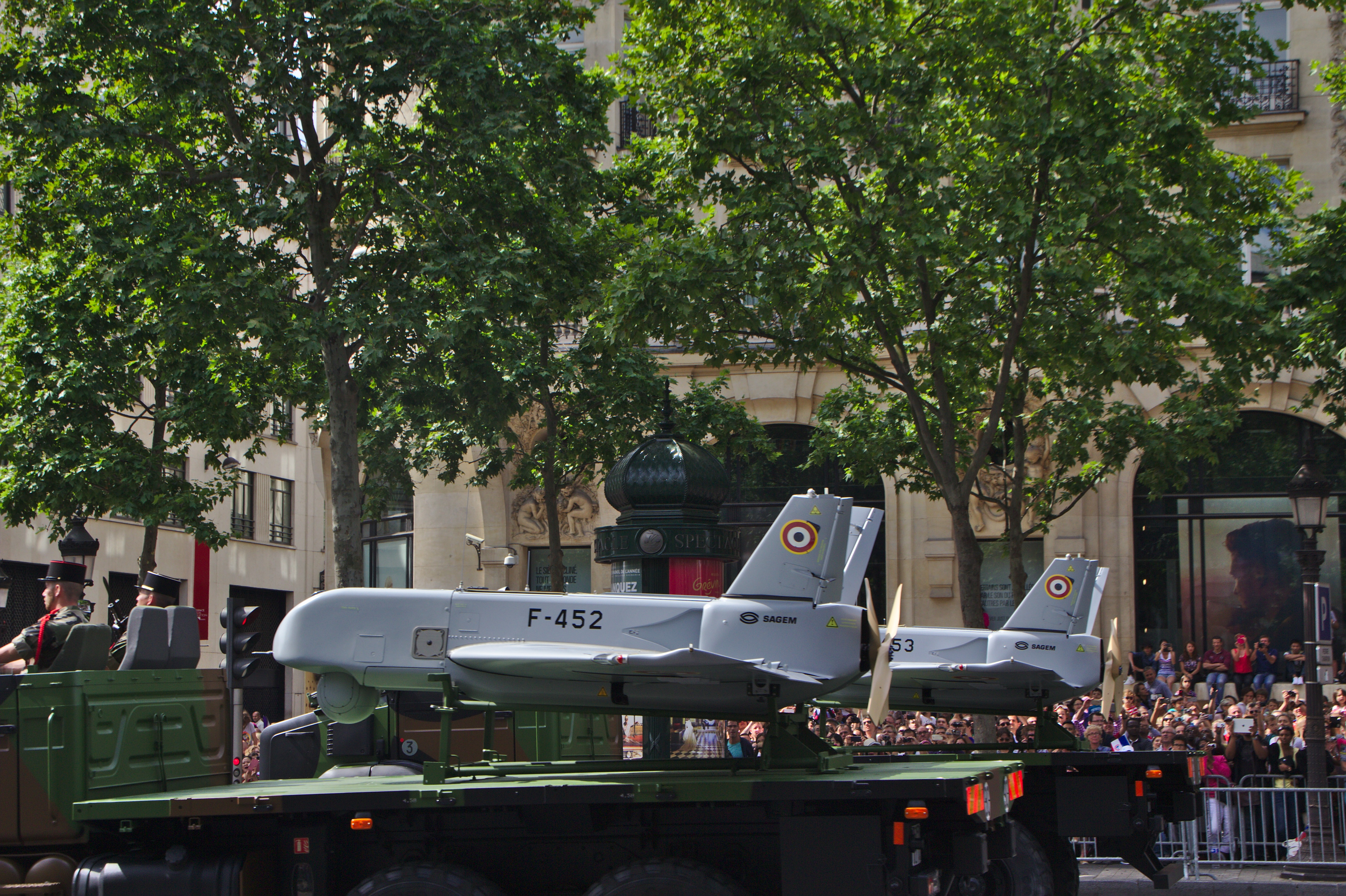
A drone presented during the 2015 parade

The 2012 parade was led by the Armed Forces units in Afghanistan (the Foreign Legion included), several NATO countries' armed forces, and France's UN peacekeeping units. A parachutist who took part in the parade's finale parachute display was injured and taken care of at once by the medical personnel, in front of everyone in attendance.

2013's parade saw troops from Mali (including members of the French-led multinational intervention force) and Croatia, the newest EU member, march past. The Hector Berlioz arrangement of the national anthem was played on this parade by the band of the Troupes de Marine (forming the medal of the National Order of Merit on the grounds of the Place de la Concorde together with civilian participants forming the ribbon) and the French Army Chorus with soloist Florian Laconi, honouring the golden jubilee of the foundation of the National Order of Merit.

To mark the centennial of the outbreak of the First World War, the 2014 parade started with a detachment of soldiers wearing the 1916 blue-grey French uniform which was followed by colour guards from the 69 other countries involved in the Great War aside from France itself. Among the countries represented included nations from the former Soviet Union (ex. Russia, Moldova, Belarus, Tajikistan) nations from the British Commonwealth (ex. New Zealand, Australia, United Kingdom) and other allied nations such as the United States and former French colonies. The motorised parade ended with a limber team carrying a 75mm field gun, immediately behind the mounted French Republican Guard Cavalry Regiment. The 2014 parade ended with a choreographic performance by José Montalvo.

The performance included 250 young dancers from the eighty countries which fought in the war; it took place on the Place de la Concorde. The eight-minute performance to a clarinet concerto by Mozart included echoes to La Sardane de la paix and La Colombe, two paintings by Pablo Picasso, as well as Les Oiseaux by Georges Braque. The dancers released doves at the end of the performance, a symbol of peace through strength after the military parade. The national anthem and classic French patriotic songs La Madelon and Chant du départ were sung a cappella by the French Army Chorus during the pre-parade segment.

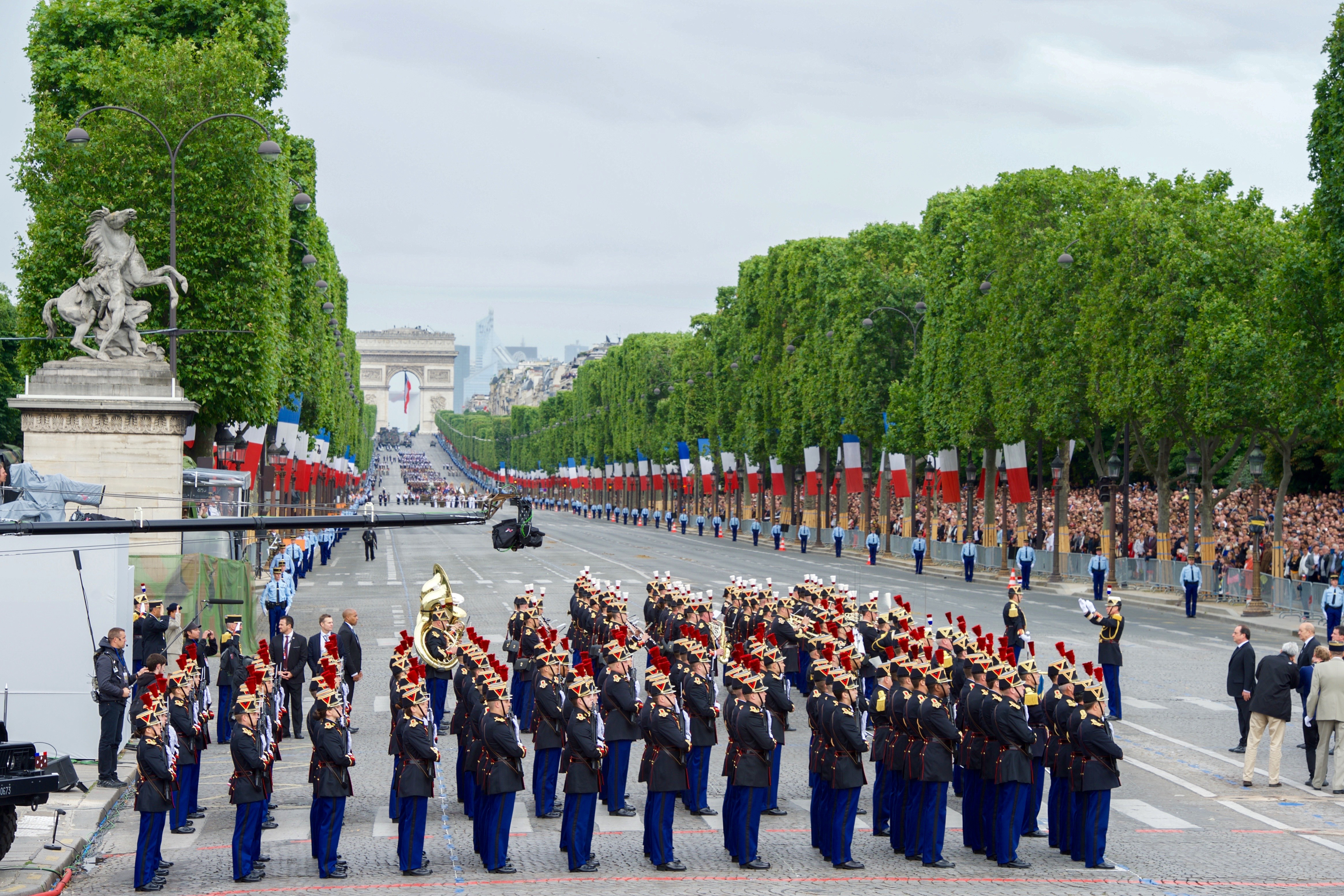
The Bastille Day 2016 military parade in Paris

The 2015 edition, which had 250 less personnel due to domestic and international deployments of the French uniformed services, celebrated the 70th year since the end of the Second World War and the liberation of France from the Axis, as well as France's determination to fight all forms of terrorism. This parade saw the debut appearance of two special forces units of the French National Police and the GIGN from the National Gendarmerie, which had seen action during January's Charlie Hebdo shooting incident as well as cadets of the Heroic Military Academy, Heroic Naval School and the Air Force College from Mexico.

In tribute to all the French fallen and veterans of the Second World War the Patrouille de France flew over the dais, in Cross of Lorraine formation. The pre-parade segment saw the French Navy Band forming the same formation together with the French Army Chorus, which sung Le Chant des Partisans a capella before singing the national anthem. In celebration of 70 years since the liberation of France and the end of the Second World War in Europe, these were joined by six recipients of the Order of Liberation, and colour guards of units that had been awarded with the order for their actions as part of the Free French forces.

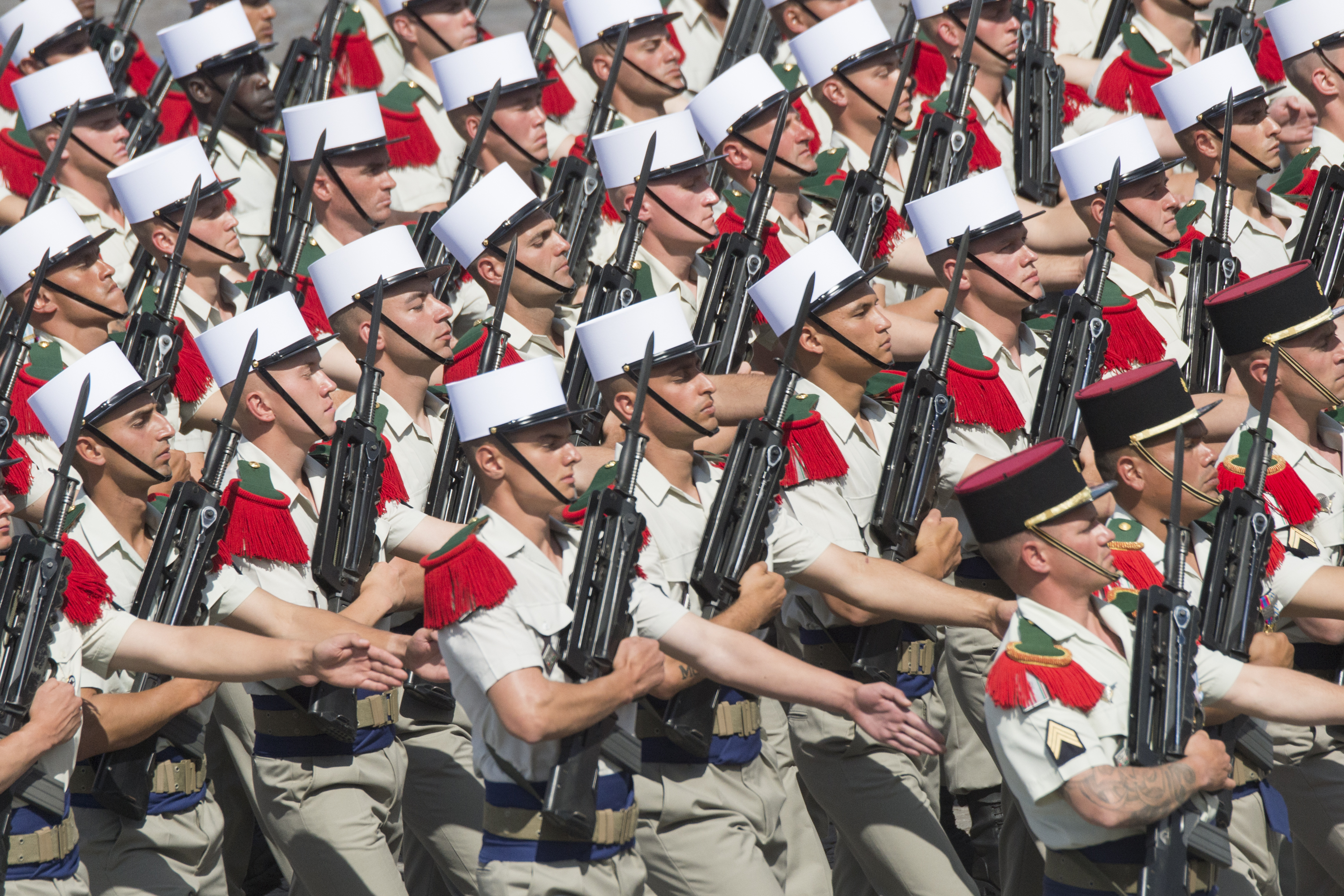
The Bastille Day 2017 military parade in Paris

The 2016 parade marked a massive increase in the number of participants, with 5,800 taking part in the march past itself. Personnel from the French Prisons Service Directorate of the Ministry of Justice were included. Participating units represented French military and police actions within France and overseas, partly as a result of the November 2015 Paris attacks. As a tribute to casualties amongst security and military forces, the Patrouille de France flew over the dais in a silhouette of the Eiffel Tower, while a 4,000 strong children's choir, dressed in the national colours, sang the national anthem alongside the French Army Chorus.

Increased anti-terror efforts were marked by the marchpast of armed forces basic training institutions and personnel involved in counter-terrorist operations. In addition, to mark the 2016 national centennial of the events of the Battle of the Somme and the formation of the Lafayette Escadrille, marching in the parade were an ANZAC contingent from both the Australian Defence Force and the New Zealand Defence Force while several aircraft of the United States Air Forces in Europe - Air Forces Africa, including one in the historical Lafayette Squadron colours, joined the flypast.

United States President Donald Trump attended the 2017 parade as the foreign guest for that year, marking the centennial since the United States entry into the First World War. The parade for that year had an estimated 6,500 personnel marching in the march past proper alone, while United States Armed Forces (United States Army Europe, II Marine Expeditionary Force, Naval Forces Europe, United States Air Forces in Europe - Air Forces Africa) delegations (with a combined total of 2,100 personnel) were expected to take part in the celebrations. That year, President Emmanuel Macron made his holiday address, the first President to do so in the parade grandstand, before the parade began. This was the parade that the reconstituted National Guard took part for the very first time since its reactivation months earlier. A medley of Daft Punk songs was played that year The visit served as an inspiration for a similar event in the United States, first the 2018 Washington Veterans Day Parade (which was cancelled due to cost) and later the "Salute to America" on 4 July 2019.

The 2018 parade marking the centennial year of the conclusion of the First World War was expected to be held with more than 7,500 troops in attendance in the ground column alone, with 480 vehicles in the mobile column, more than last year's parade, in what is one of the major international celebrations of this event, with the Prime Minister of Singapore, Lee Hsien Loong and the Japanese foreign minister, Taro Kono, as the international guests. Unlike previous years colour guards from the SAFTI Military Institute and the National Defense Academy of Japan took part on behalf of their respective armed services, and the parade was preceded by a joint service contingent (Armed Forces, National Guard, National Gendarmerie, National Police and Customs) representing recent public security and civil relief operations within France and its overseas territories and increased French military operational duties at overseas operations in support of NATO and French speaking countries' armed services. The flypast included M-346 advanced trainer jets from the 150th Squadron, Republic of Singapore Air Force, the first time ever that an Asian air force had taken part in the parade fly past segment.

The 2019 parade marked a number of anniversaries: the 230th anniversary of the beginning of the French Revolution of 1789, the 75th anniversary of the D-Day landings and the 80th of the beginning of the Second World War, the centennial of the historic parade of 1919, the 70th anniversary of the foundation of NATO and the 30th since the raising of the Franco-German Brigade. Over 4,000 troops, 100 pieces of aviation and over 300 vehicles were on parade. It was attended by French President Emmanuel Macron and dignitaries from more than 20 countries across the world. 6 world leaders were presented, they were: German Chancellor Angela Merkel, Estonian President Kersti Kaljulaid, Dutch Prime Minister Mark Rutte, Portuguese President Marcelo Rebelo de Sousa, Finnish President Sauli Niinistö and NATO Secretary General Jens Stoltenberg. 10 color guards from European Intervention Initiative countries took part in the parade, as well as a larger contingent from the Spanish Army. During the exhibition prior to the flypast that signals the start of the parade, a turbine powered hoverboard invention called the Flyboard Air was flown throughout the central area with its inventor Franky Zapata on it.

The parade of 2020, as well as the preparatory activities for this the 140th year of the regular celebrations of the birth of nationhood, was affected by the ongoing coronavirus pandemic that had affected the country. The parade carried on as a smaller celebration in the grounds of the Place de la Concorde, with no mobile column and with the usual smaller marchpast and the flypast column, with participation by two Royal Air Force Eurofighter Typhoons, alongside personnel from the Bundeswehr, the color guard of the Gardebataillon from the Austrian Armed Forces, the Hellenic Armed Forces, the Swiss Armed Forces and the Netherlands Armed Forces. It was the first time since the end of the Second World War that the parade was scaled back.

The parade honored the military, police and civilian medical workers nationwide and all the uniformed service men and women from the country's uniformed organizations who have been at the forefront of the response to the pandemic and their actions to support the well-being of the populace at home and abroad, with many of them being present. The parade capped off with the playing of the National Anthem by the French Army Chorus. The La Musique de l'Air performed John Williams' Summon the Heroes and Olympic Fanfare and Theme, both as a reminder of the nation's preparedness in hosting the 2024 Summer Olympics to be held in the capital, while marking the 190th year of the July Revolution of 1830, the golden jubilee anniversary since the passing of President Charles de Gaulle, the 80th anniversary of the formation of the Free French Forces and the establishment of the Order of Liberation, the 75th diamond jubilee since the victory over the Axis Powers and the end of the Second World War and the 60th anniversary of the country's first ever nuclear test.

The French Foreign Legion Music Band performed before the marchpast began. During the pre-parade segment, two French Army tanks from the Armoured Cavalry Arm dating from the Second World War were presented before the dignitaries, in remembrance of de Gaulle's career in the army during that war, as a regimental commander before assuming his leadership role as leader of the Free French. These tanks, one Char D2 and one Renault R35, honoured his prior role as commandant of the 507th Tank Regiment.

The 2021 edition of the parade returned to the traditional route of the Champs-Élysées. For the first time in a year officer cadet battalions of Armed Forces academies included cadets and officers from NATO countries' armed forces. Two military tattoo-inspired segments served as the opening and closing, respectively, of the parade. As a tribute to the ongoing fight against the COVID-19 pandemic at home and abroad, a battalion of the Defense Health Service marched as part of the 10,000 strong ground column, which was led off by a composite battalion of special forces and military personnel representing armed forces operations, together with personnel from EU armed forces, in French-speaking Africa.

In the 2023 parade, Prime Minister of India, Narendra Modi was invited as the Guest of Honour for the parade. The Indian tri-services; Indian Army, Indian Navy and Indian Air Force contingents were also a part of the parade. A 269-member Contingent of Indian Armed Forces marched alongside their French counterparts. The 2023 parade also celebrated the 25 years of collaboration and strategic partnership between the two countries.

The parade of 2024, for the first time held at Jean de Lattre de Tassigny Square, marked the 235th year of the Revolution of 1789, the 80th anniversary of D-Day and the Liberation of France, and NATO's Diamond Jubilee anniversary, while also marking the nation's final countdown of the 2024 Paris Summer Olympics - as represented by military athletes being present for the finale and the Olympic flame's welcome into the capital integrated as well into it. No mobile column was presented this time, but the air column was present as in past parades. The ground column was led by those existing armed forces units carrying battle honours from the events of 1944 and before that by a multinational military colour guard honoring all who took part decades prior.

In 2025, France invited Indonesia to open the parade with 260 Indonesian military personnel to mark the 75th anniversary of their diplomatic relations. The contingent consisted of 88 from the Indonesian Army, 86 from the Indonesian Navy and 86 from the Indonesian Air Force), also accompanied by a drum band of 189 musicians, in the presence of Indonesian President Prabowo Subianto, the guest of honor of Emmanuel Macron. The parade was also marked by the centenary of the Bleuet de France.

The parade of 2026 saw 35 contingents from member states of the coalition of the willing as well as the Kyiv Presidential Honor Guard Battalion of the Armed Forces of Ukraine. The event was attended by President of Ukraine Volodymyr Zelenskyy and First Lady Olena Zelenska, the heads of state and government of nations within the coalition as well as Prime Minister of Malta and President of Serbia.

== Composition of the parade ==
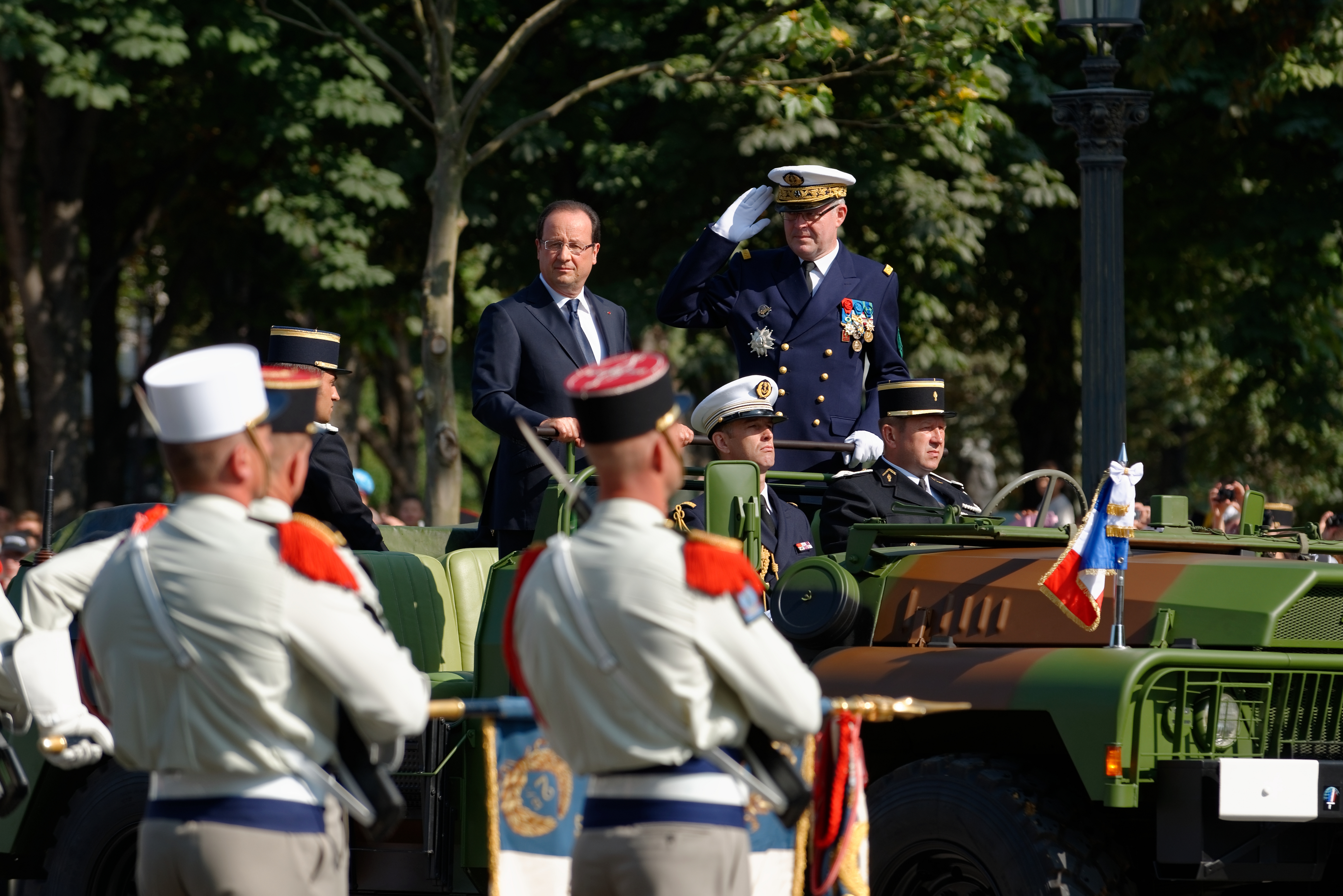
François Hollande, President of France, alongside Admiral Édouard Guillaud, Chief of the Defence Staff reviewing the troops in an ACMAT command car.

As of the early 2010s, the parade involves around 9,500 soldiers (7,800 on foot, the rest are crew members or cavalrymen), 380 vehicles, 240 horses and more than 80 planes and helicopters. It is the largest regular military parade in Western Europe.

March past in slow and quick time

- École Polytechnique (elite scientific and engineering school with military status)
- National Gendarmerie Officer Academy
- Saint-Cyr Military Academy
- Military Inter-arms School
- Naval Military Academy
- Air Force Academy
- Military Commissariats Academy
- French Defense Health Service School
- National Military Infrastructure Engineers Academy
- National Gendarmerie NCO School
- National Active Non-Commissioned Officers School
- Navy NCO School
- Navy Seamen School
- Air Force NCO School
- French Republican Guard Infantry Regiments
- Mobile Gendarmerie
- Departmental Gendarmerie
- National Gendamerie support formations
- French Army Armoured Cavalry Arm
- French Army Paratroopers
- French Army Infantry
- French Army Mountain Troops
- French Army Artillery
- French Army Engineering Arm
- French Army Marine Troops
- French Army Transport Command
- French Army Materials and Quartermaster Command
- French Army Signals
- French Navy Naval Fusiliers
- French Navy Submarine Forces
- French Navy Surface Forces
- French Naval Aviation
- French Navy Maritime Gendarmerie
- French Air Force Fusilier Commandos
- French Air Force Air Gendarmerie
- French Air Force Logistics
- French Air Force Firefighters
- French Space Command
- Defense Health Service
- Defense Fuel Service
- National Guard
- National Police Officers School
- National Police Staff School
- National Police NCO School
- Paris Police Prefecture
- Battalion of Municipal Police
- Security Service of the Ministry of the Interior
- National Firefighting Service Officers Academy
- National Firefighting Service NCO School
- National Firefighting Service Combined Battalion
- Battalion of military personnel of Civil Defense of the Ministry of the Interior
- Paris Fire Brigade
- French Prisons Service
- Directorate-General of Customs and Indirect Taxes
- French Foreign Legion Pionniers
- Central Band of the French Foreign Legion
- French Foreign Legion Cavalry Regiment
- French Foreign Legion Infantry Battalion

Mobile column

- Motorcycle Squadrons of the National Gendarmerie (Republican Guard and Departmental Gendarmerie)
- Motorcycle Squadrons of the National Police
- Command Staff of the Mobile Column (may come from either the 1st or 3rd Armoured Divisions)
- Motorized mountain infantry battalion (provided by the Chasseurs Alpins)
- 16th Rifle Battalion (Mot) (Chasseurs à pied)
- French Army Transportation
- French Army Materials and Quartermaster Command
- French Army Motorized and Mechanized Infantry
- French Army Artillery
- French Army Armored Cavalry Arm (Spahis, Hussards, Mounted Rifle Hunters (Chasseurs à cheval) and African Rifle Hunters (Chasseurs d'Afrique), Dragoons, Cuirassiers and 501st–503rd Tank Regiment)
- French Army Engineering Arm
- Mobile regiment of Troupes de Marine
  - Infantry battalion
  - Armored battalion
  - Artillery battalion
- French Air Force Air Defense vehicles
- French Foreign Legion mobile vehicles (infantry and engineers)
- Vehicles of Defense Health Service
- Vehicles and equipment from the Defense Fuel and Commissariat Services
- Paris Fire Brigade
- Interior Ministry Civil Security

Mounted column

- Mounted Fanfare Band of the French Republican Guard
- Cavalry Regiment of the French Republican Guard

Aerial flypast column

- Patrouille de France
- French Air Force Air Squadrons and Flights
- French Army Light Aviation
- French Naval Aviation
- Interior Ministry Civil Security Air Service

== Gallery ==
=== Infantry parade ===
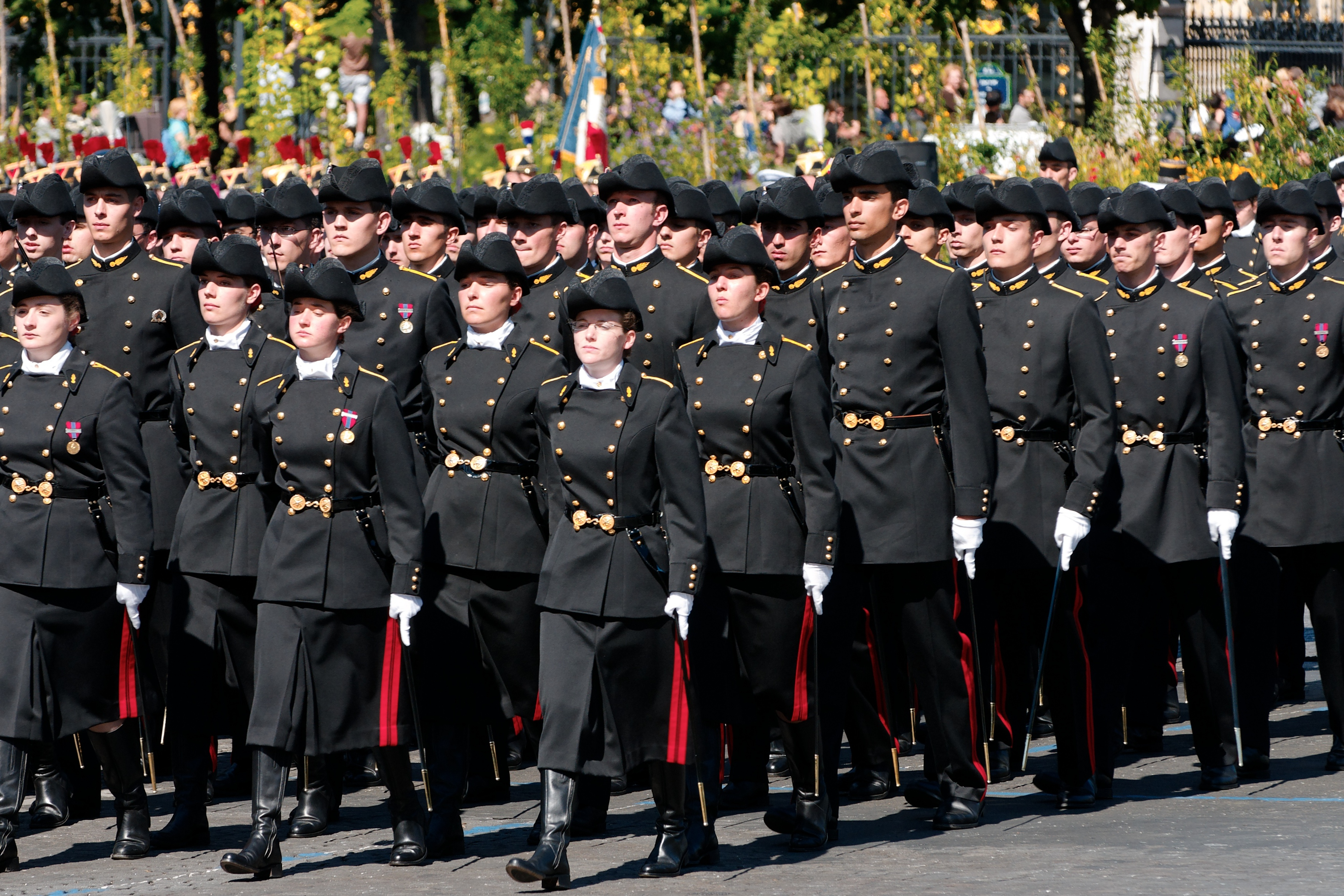
Cadets of the École polytechnique

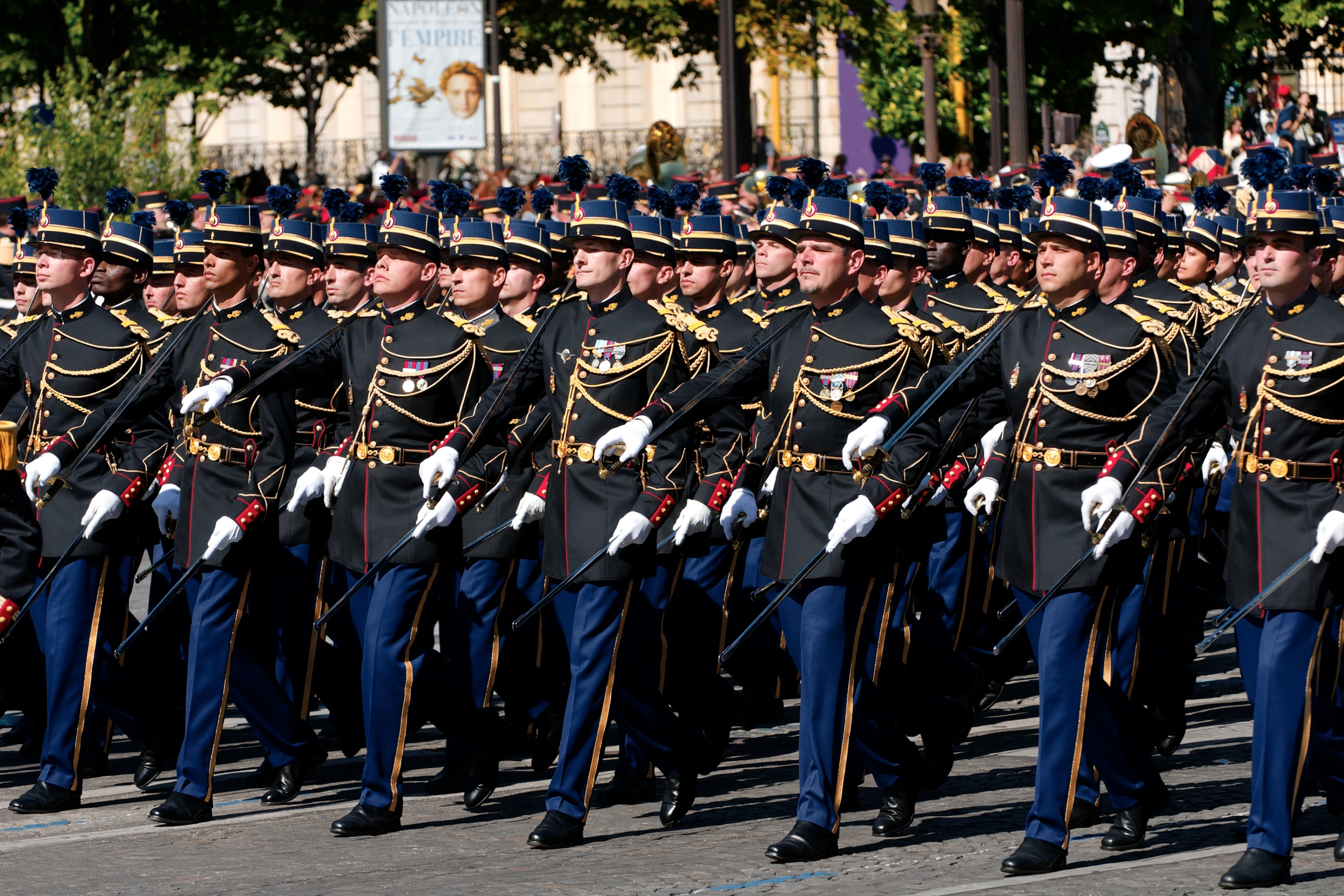
National Gendarmerie's officer cadets

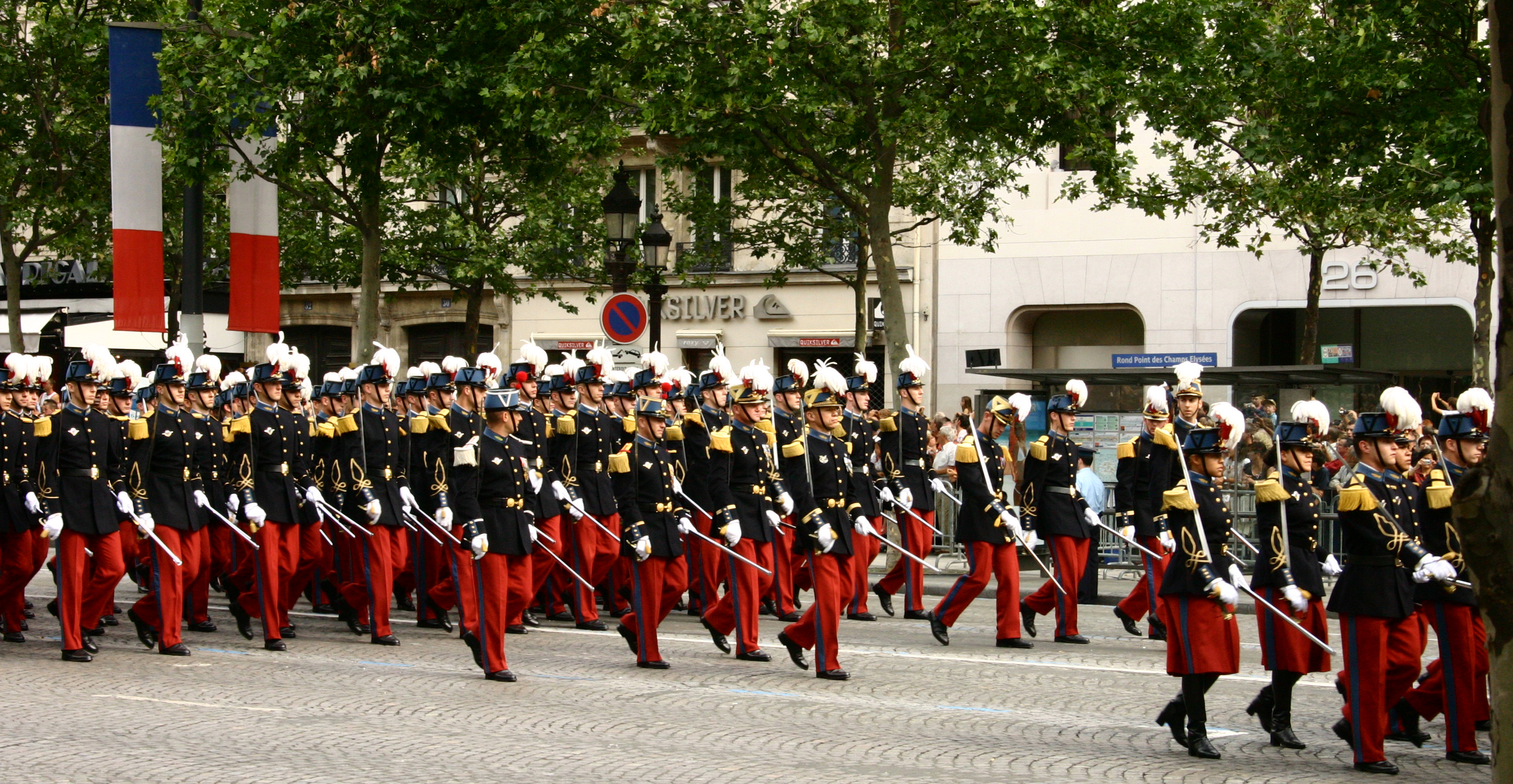
Saint-Cyr cadets

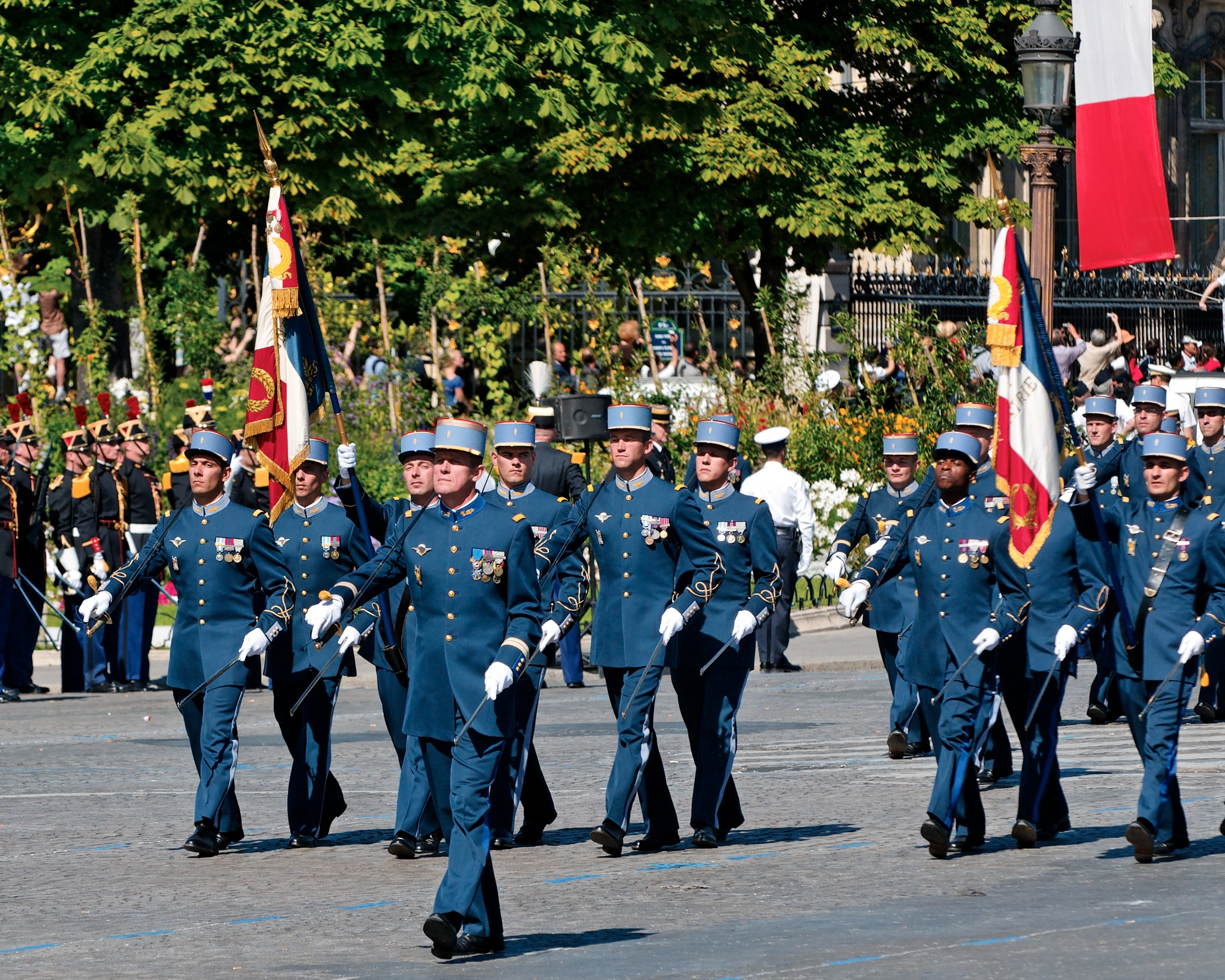
Cadets of the Military Interarms School

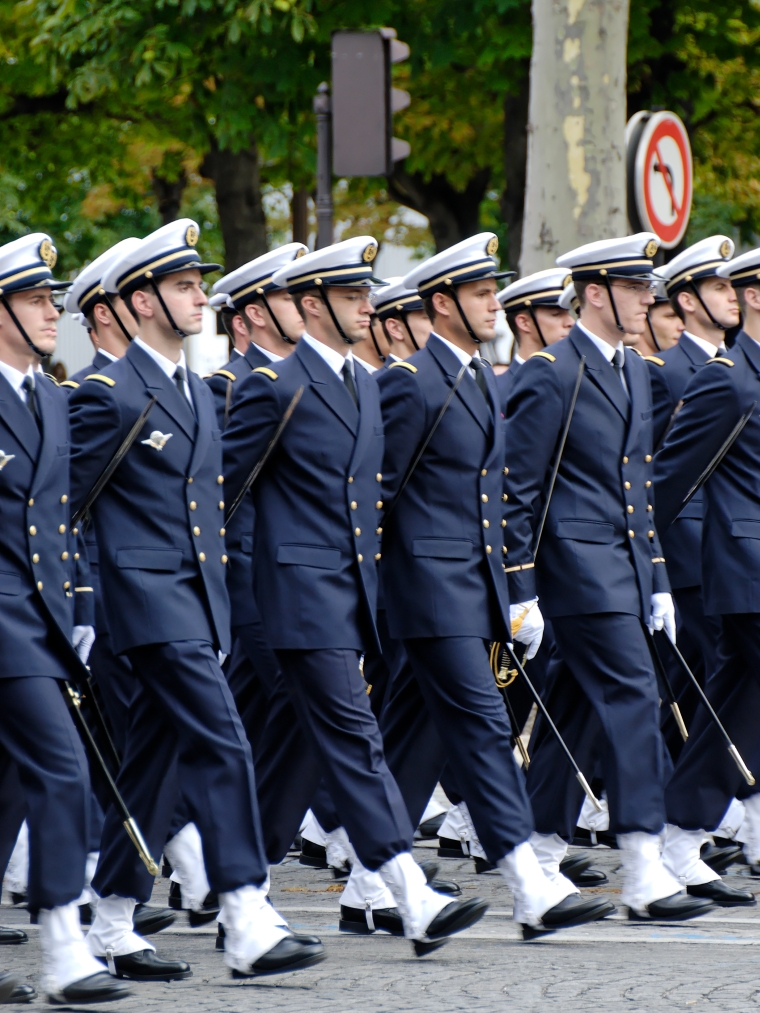
Cadets of the École Navale

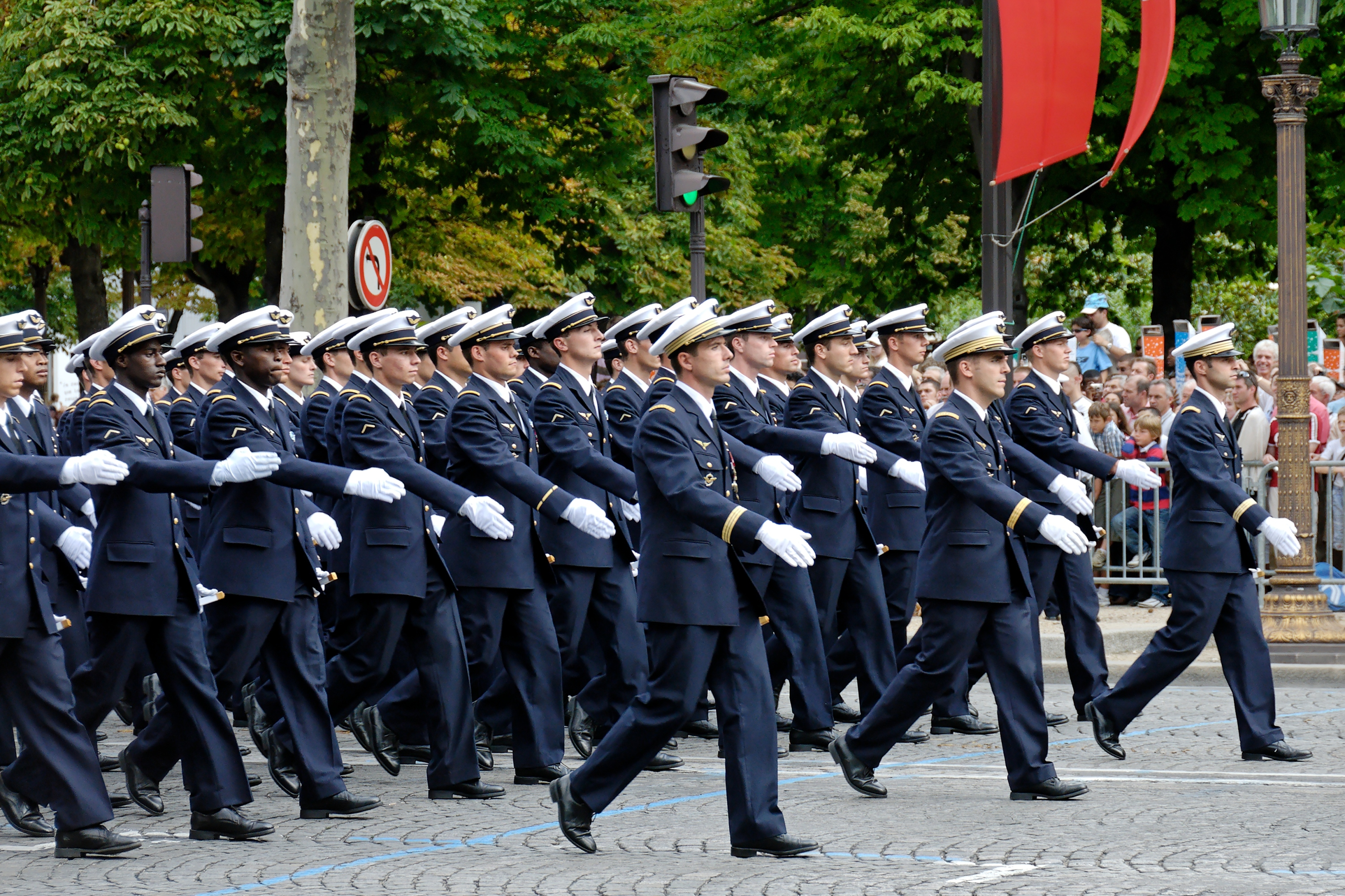
Cadets of the École de l'air

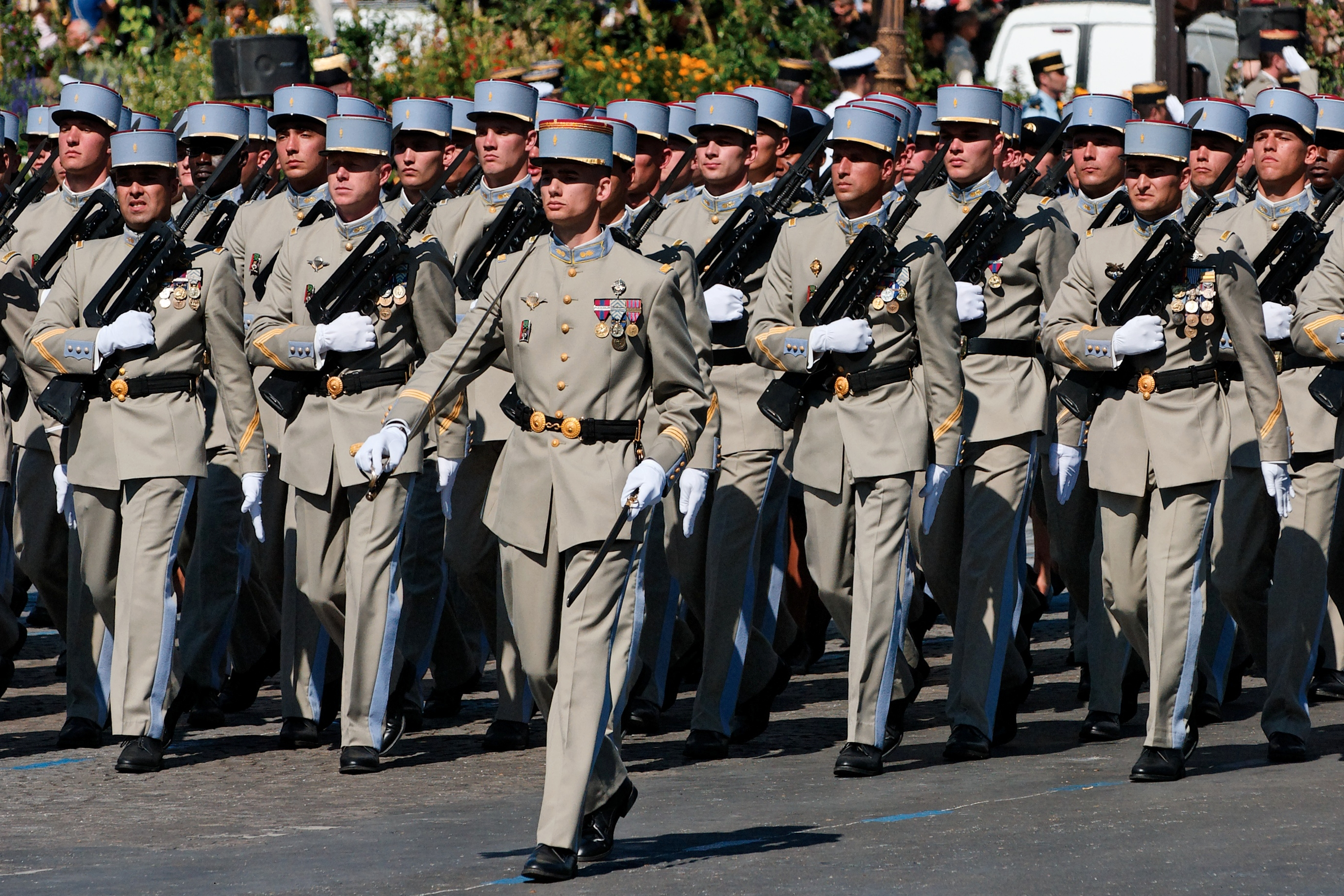
Cadets of the National Active Non-Commissioned Officers School

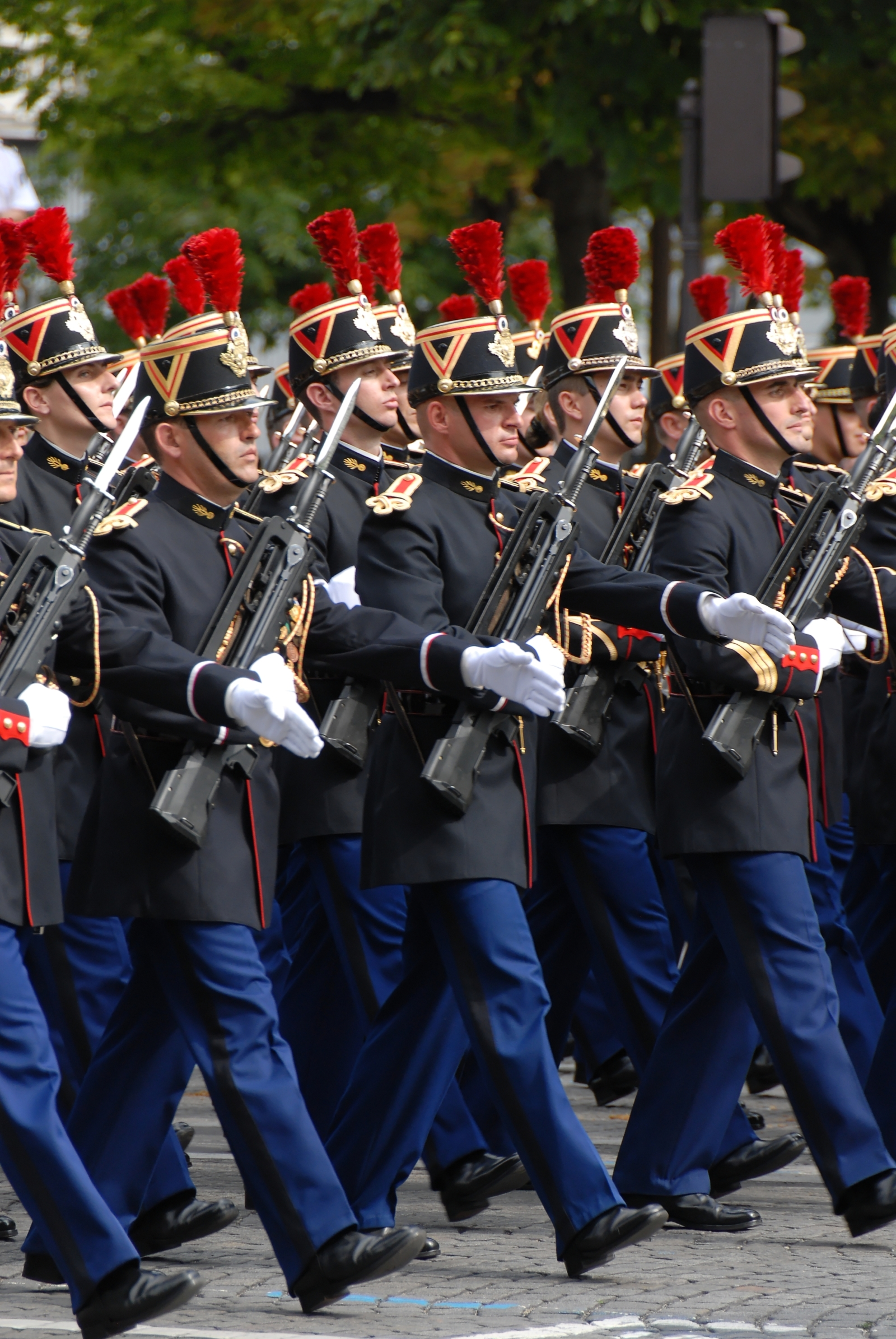
Infantry of the Republican Guard

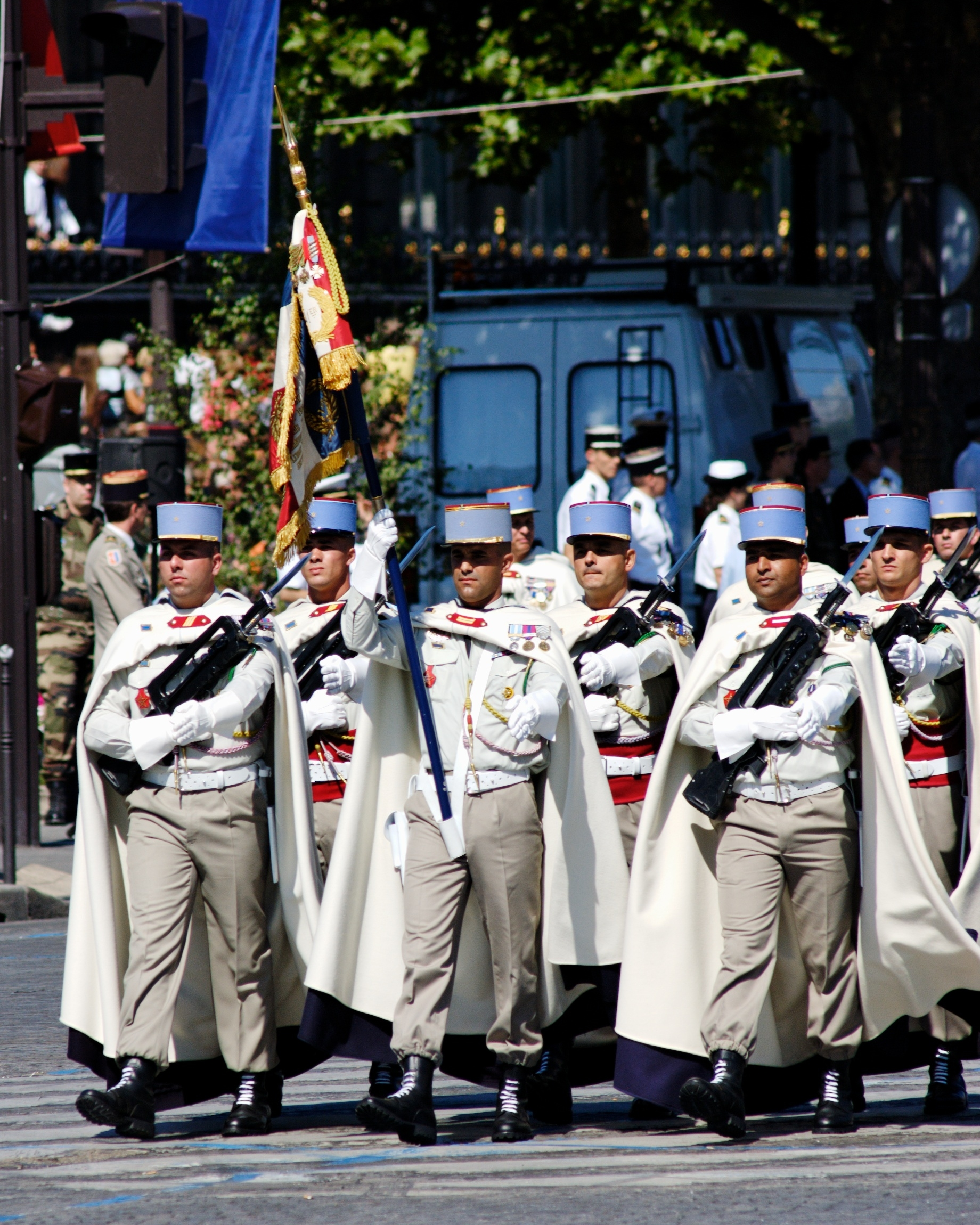
1st Regiment of Spahis

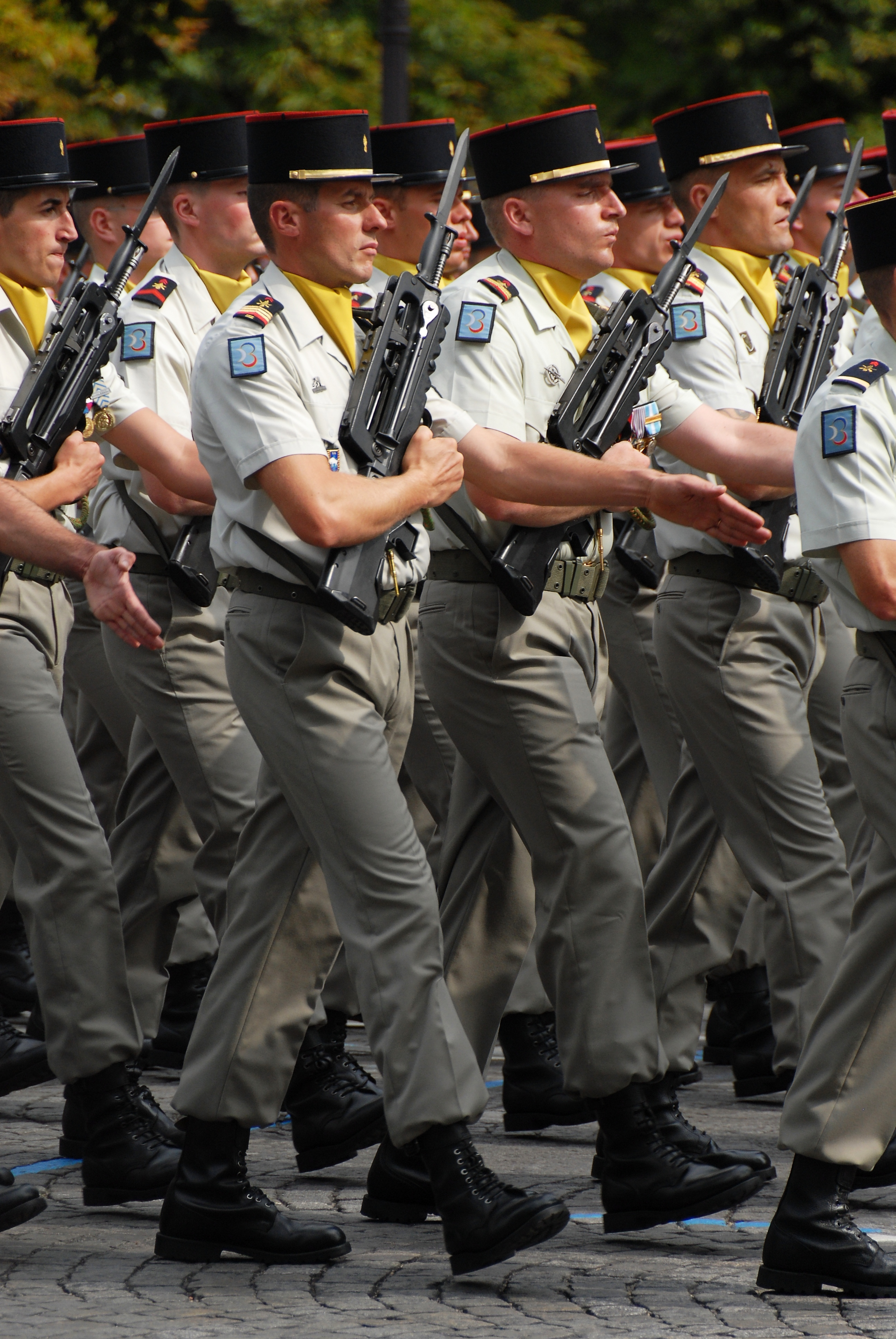
126th Line Infantry

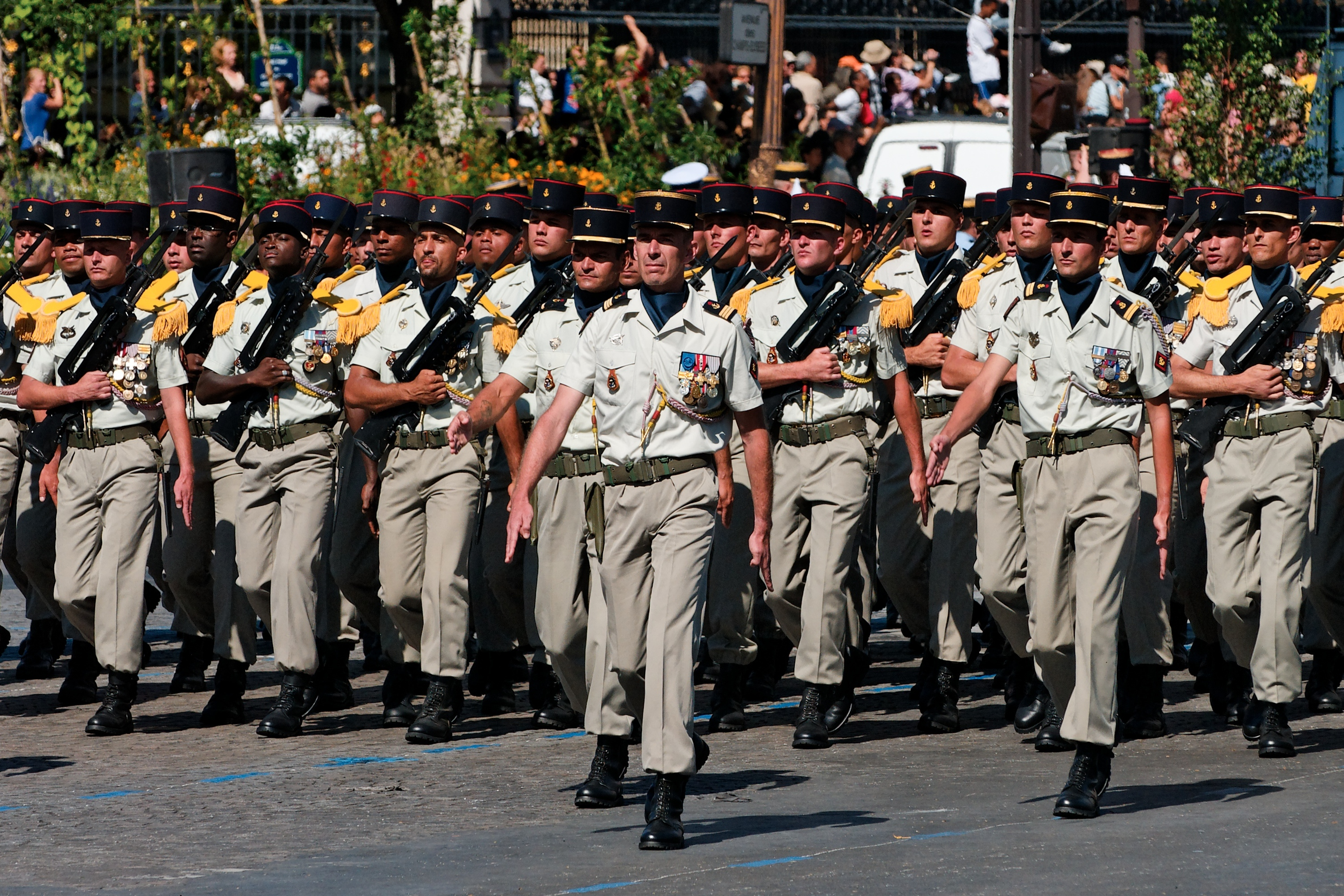
21st Regiment of Marine infantry

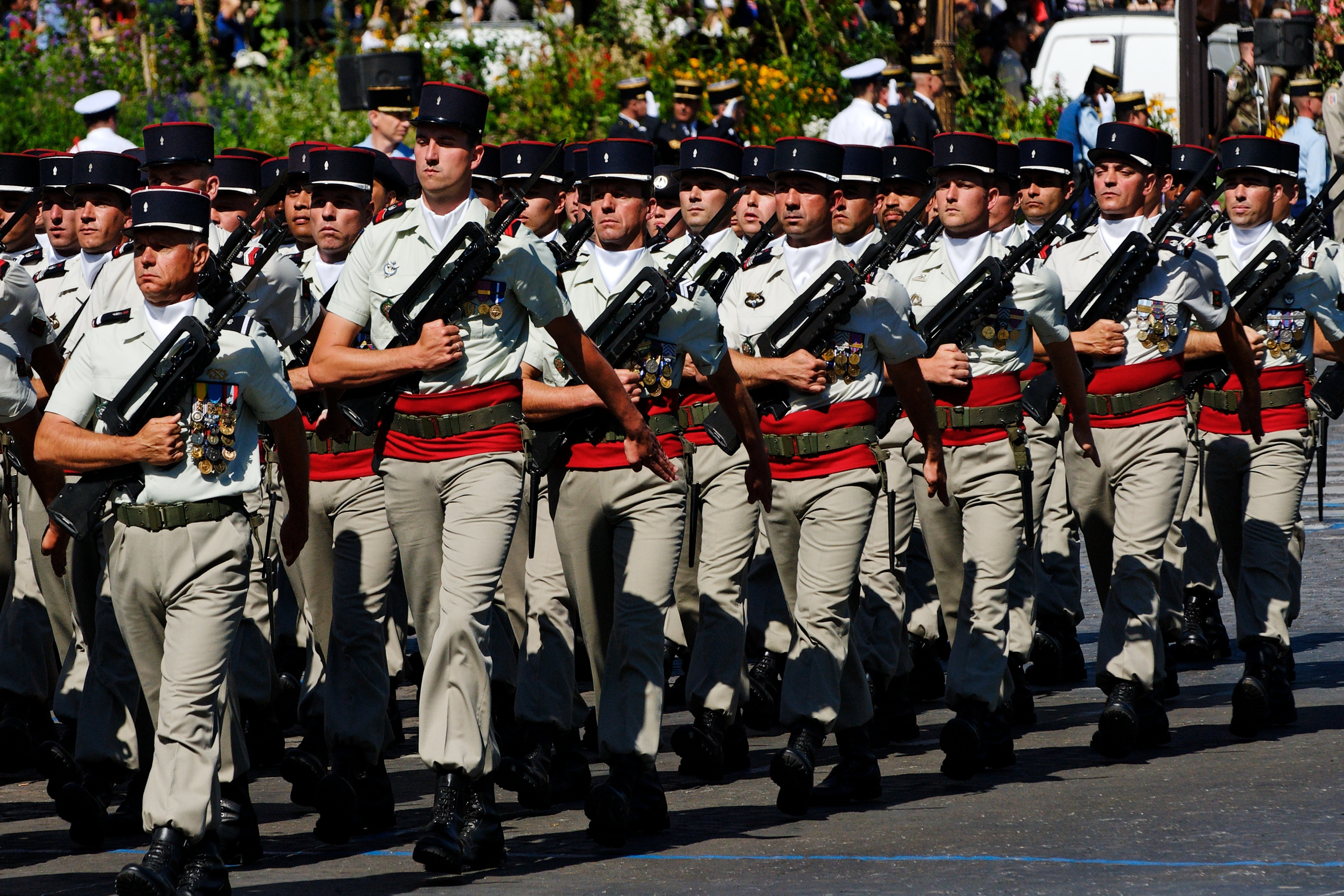
511th Transport Regiment

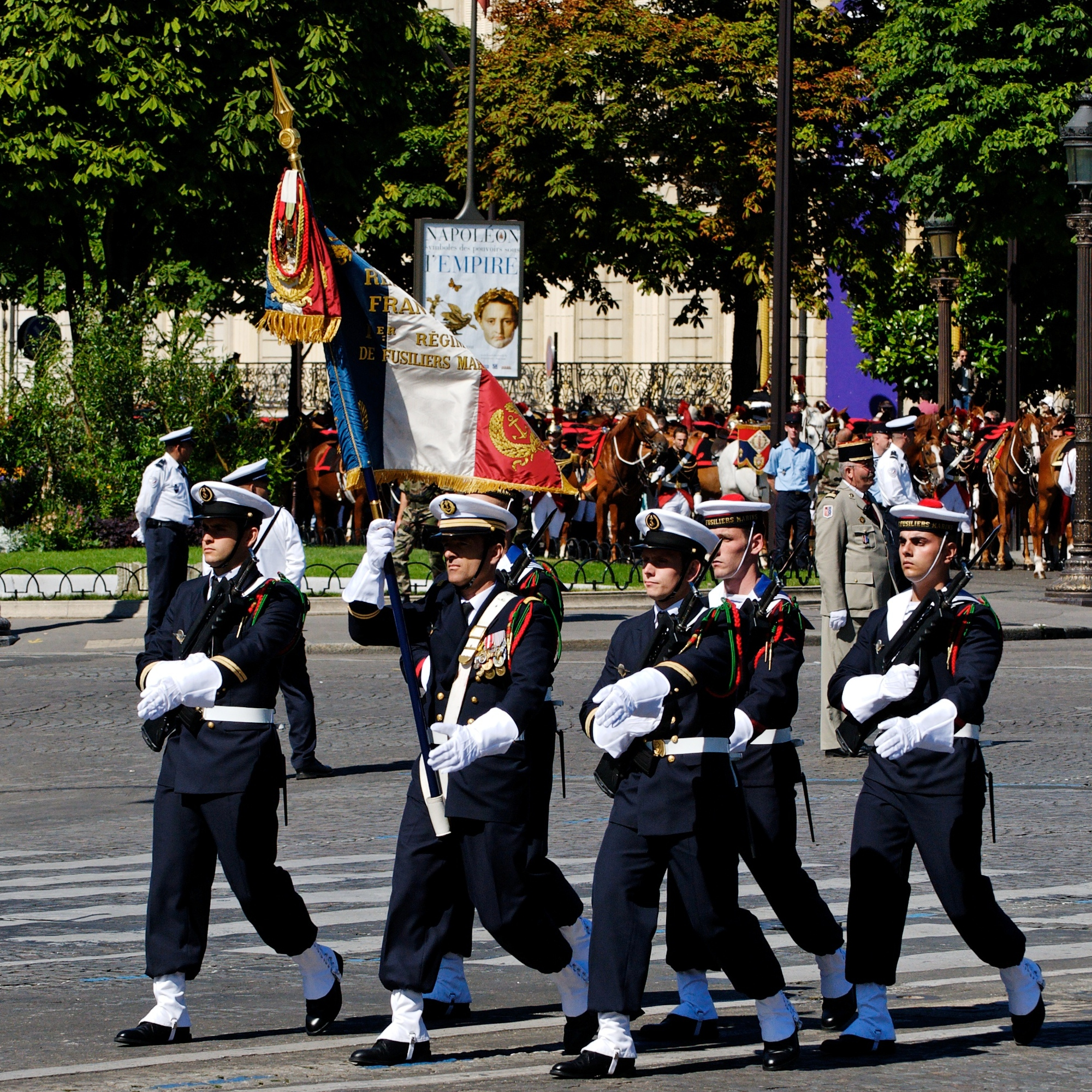
Regimental flag of the 1st Marine Fusiliers

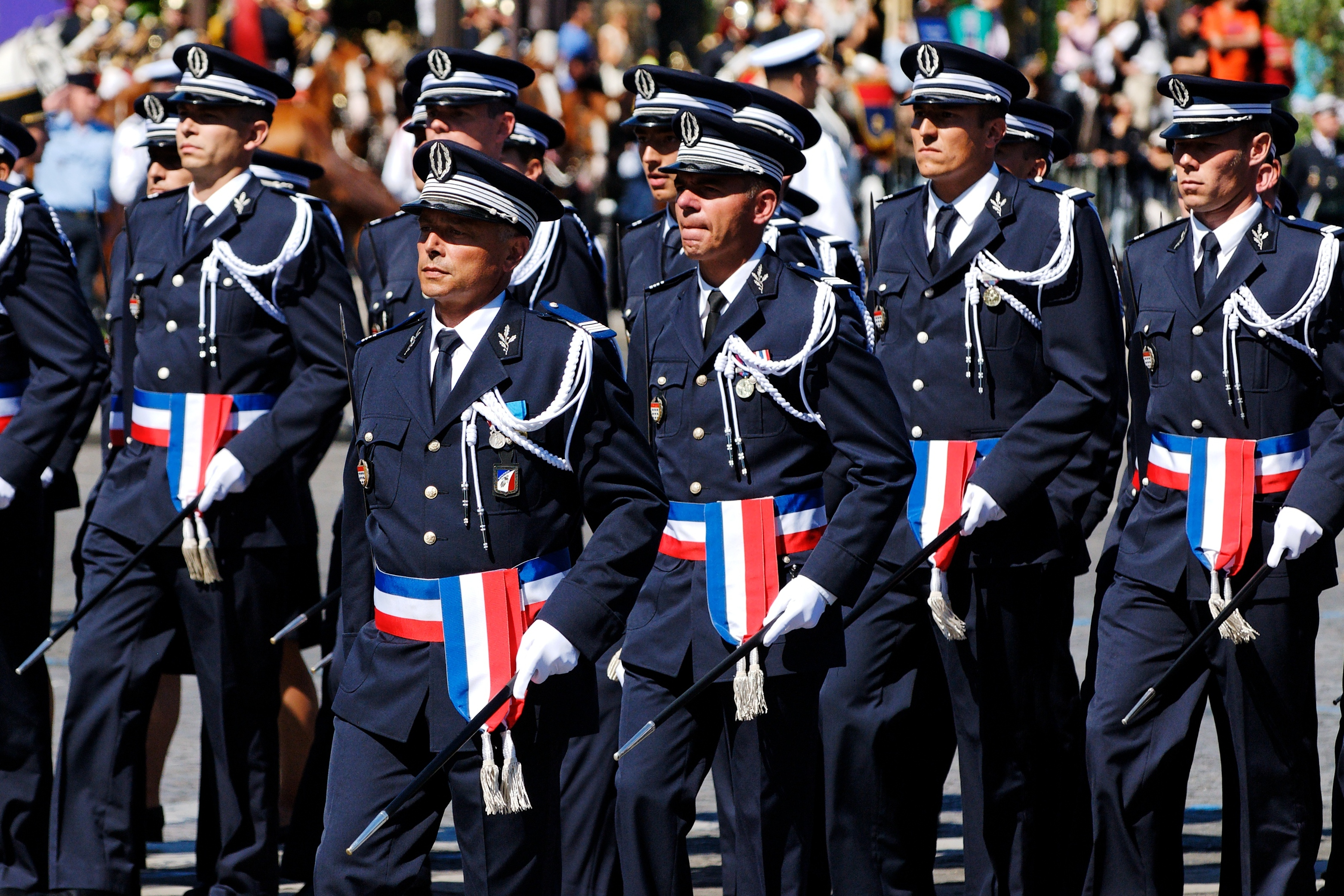
National Police Superior Officers School trainees

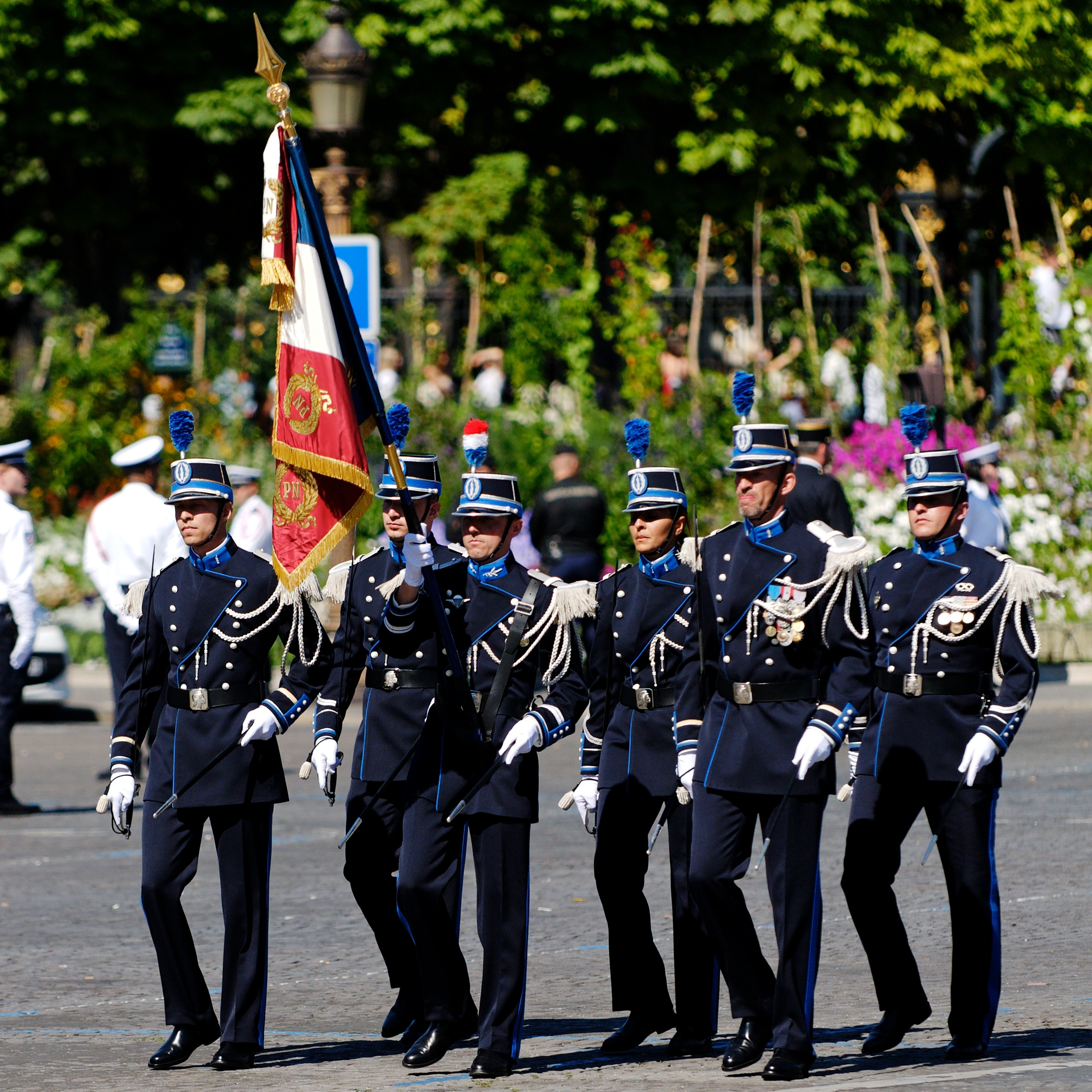
Flag of the French National Police and the Security Service of the Ministry of the Interior (SSMI)

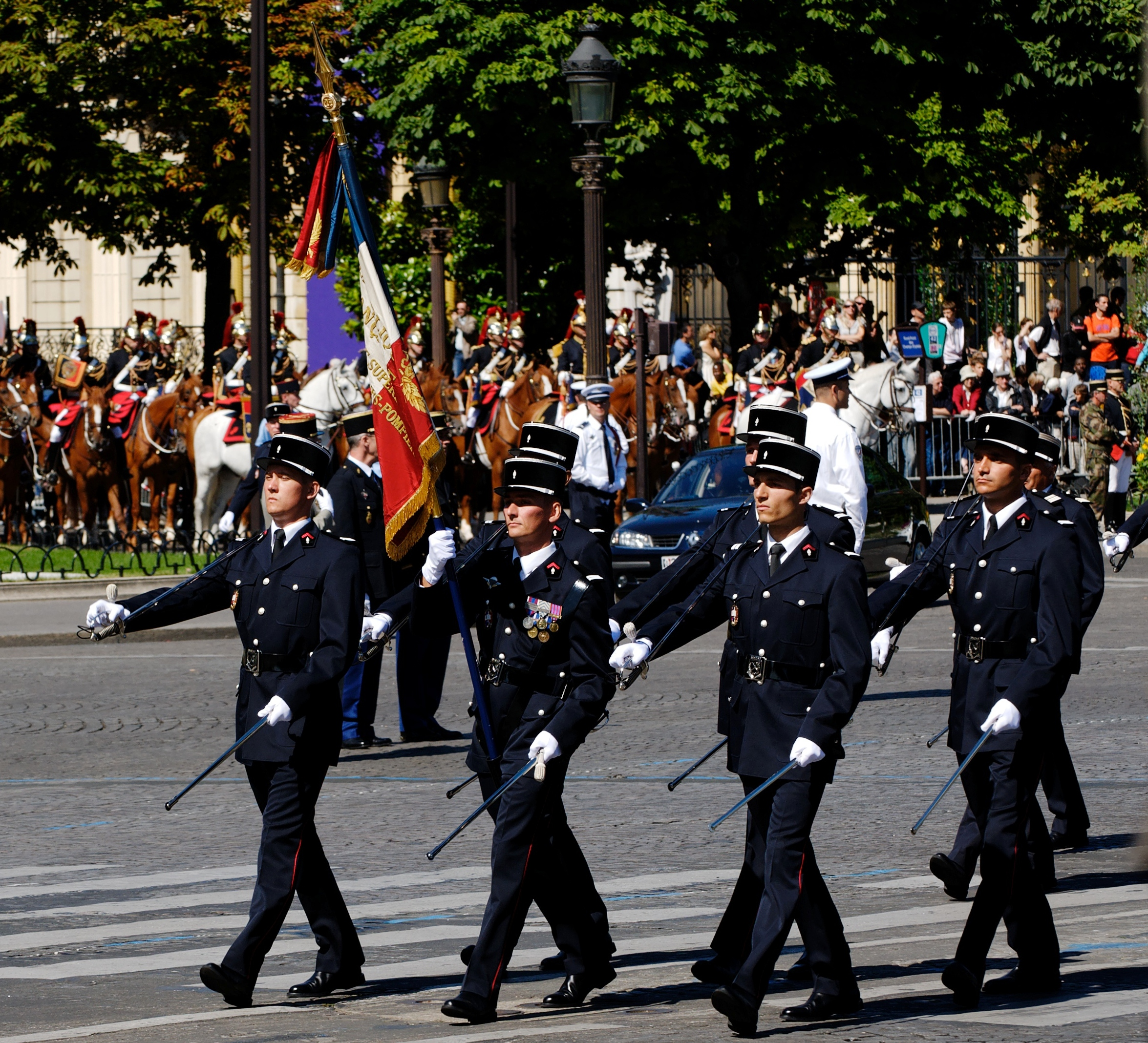
Flag guard of the French Firefighting Academy

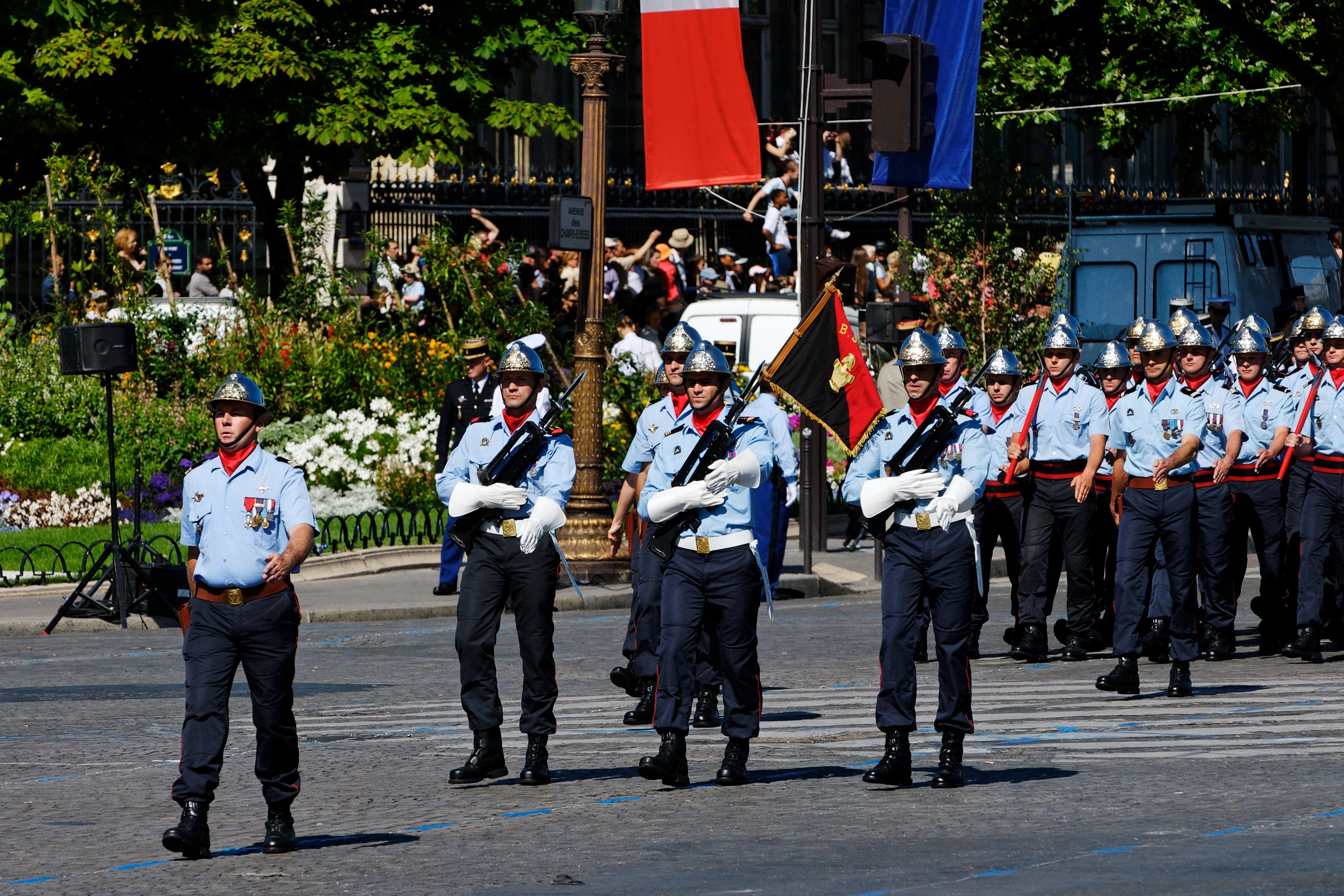
The Paris Fire Brigade

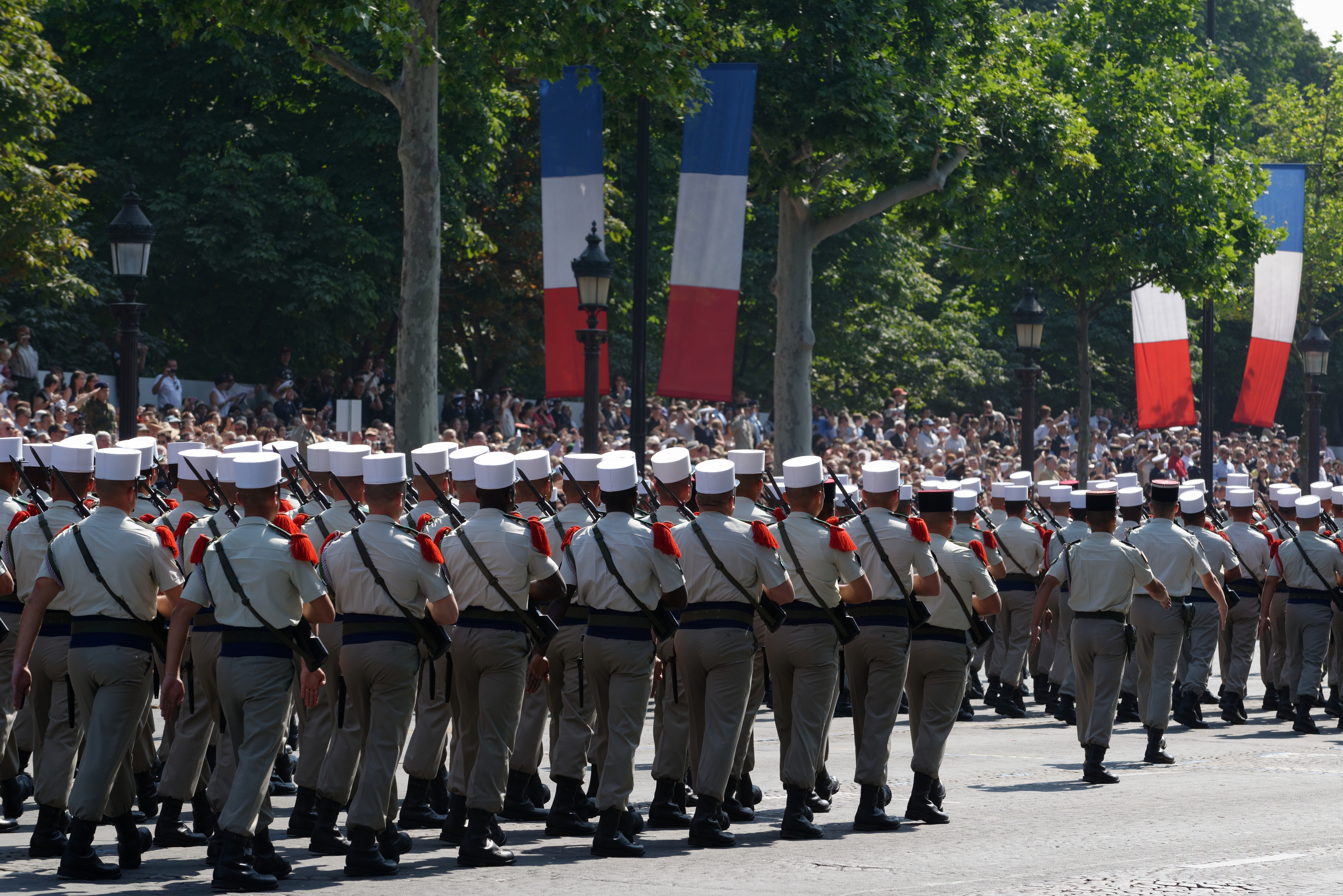
The French Foreign Legion is always last to parade because of its slower marching pace

=== Mounted/Motorised parade ===
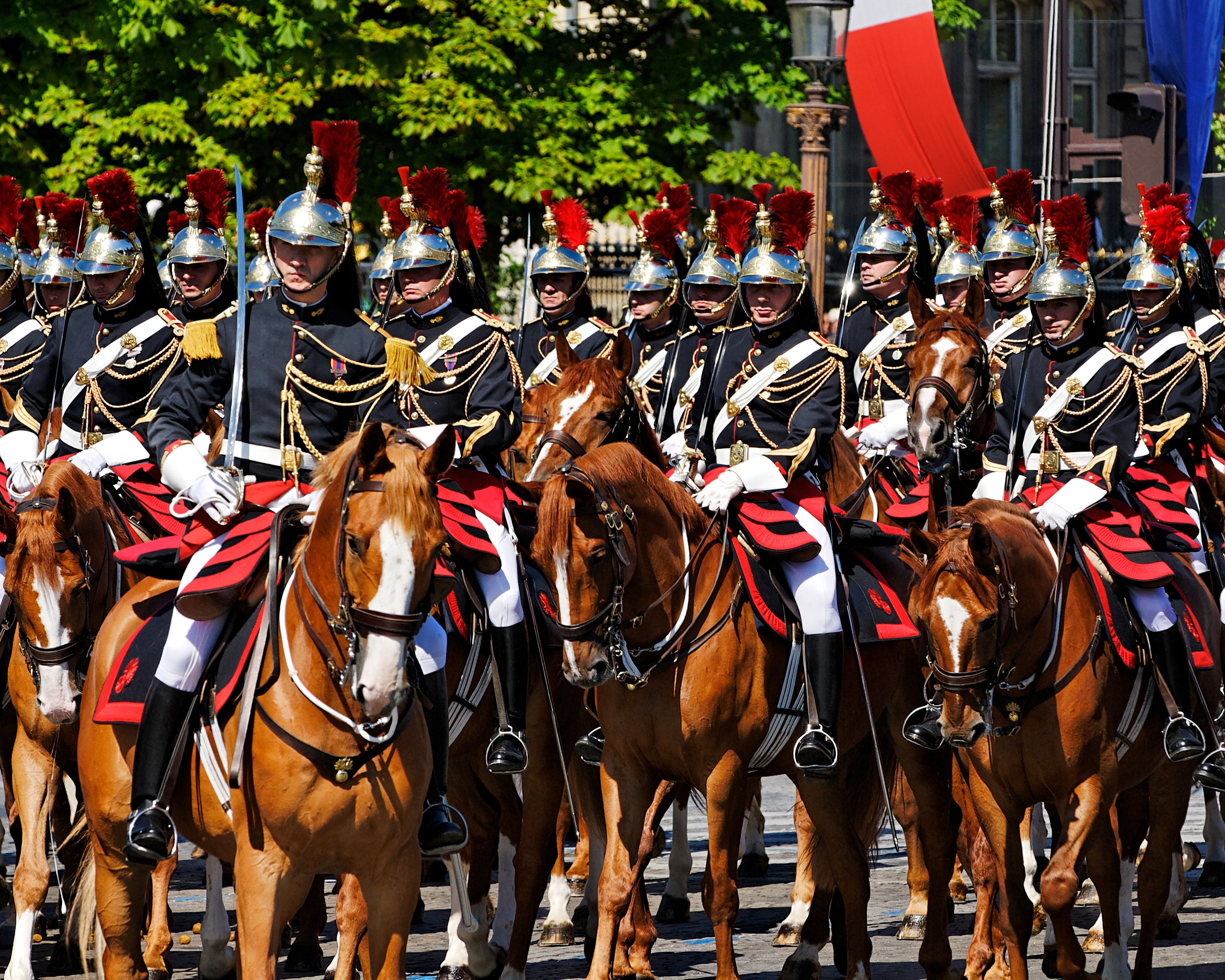
The cavalry regiment of the Republican Guard opening the motorised parade (formerly cavalry parade)

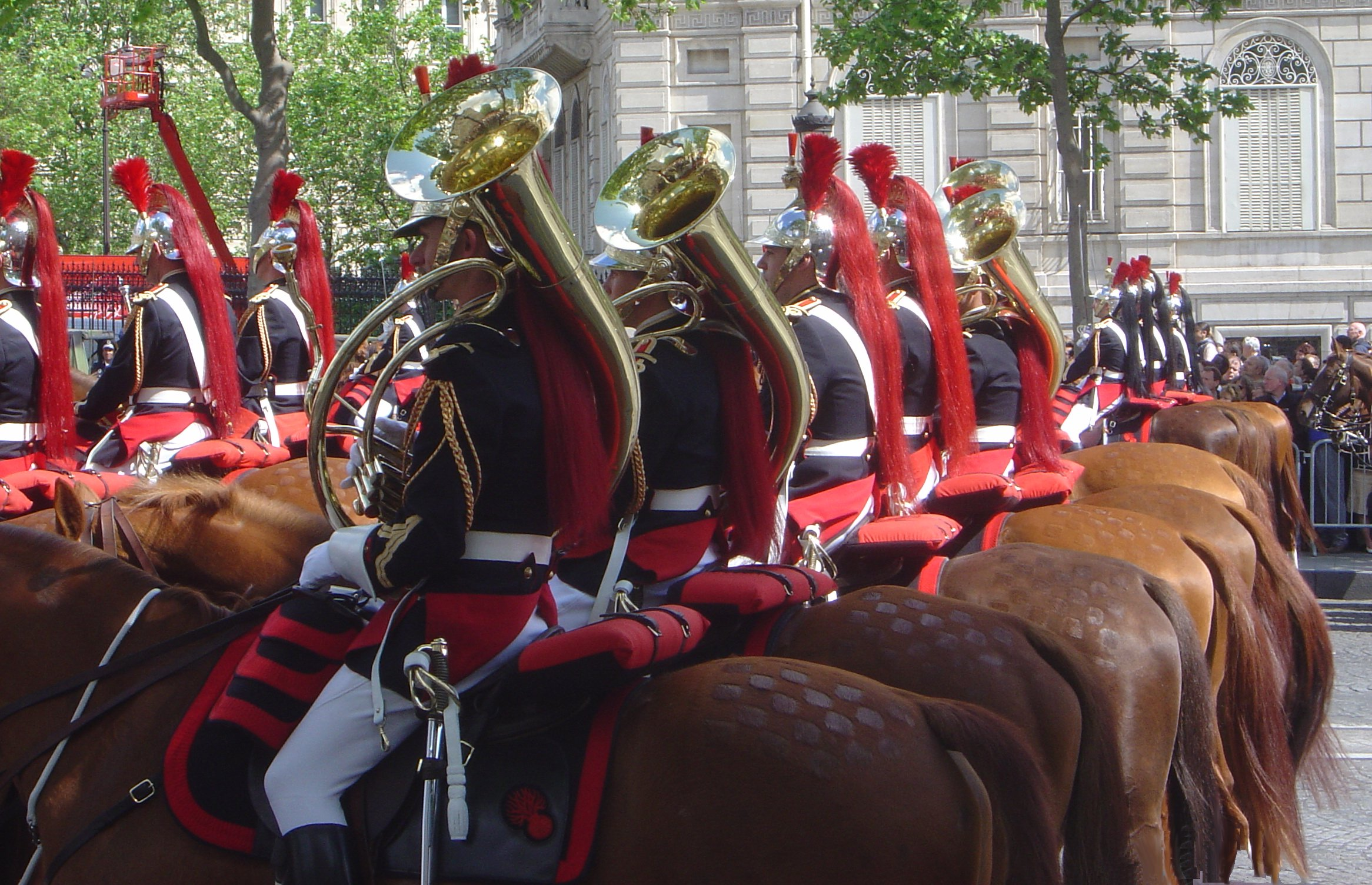
The red-crested musicians of the Republican Guard cavalry

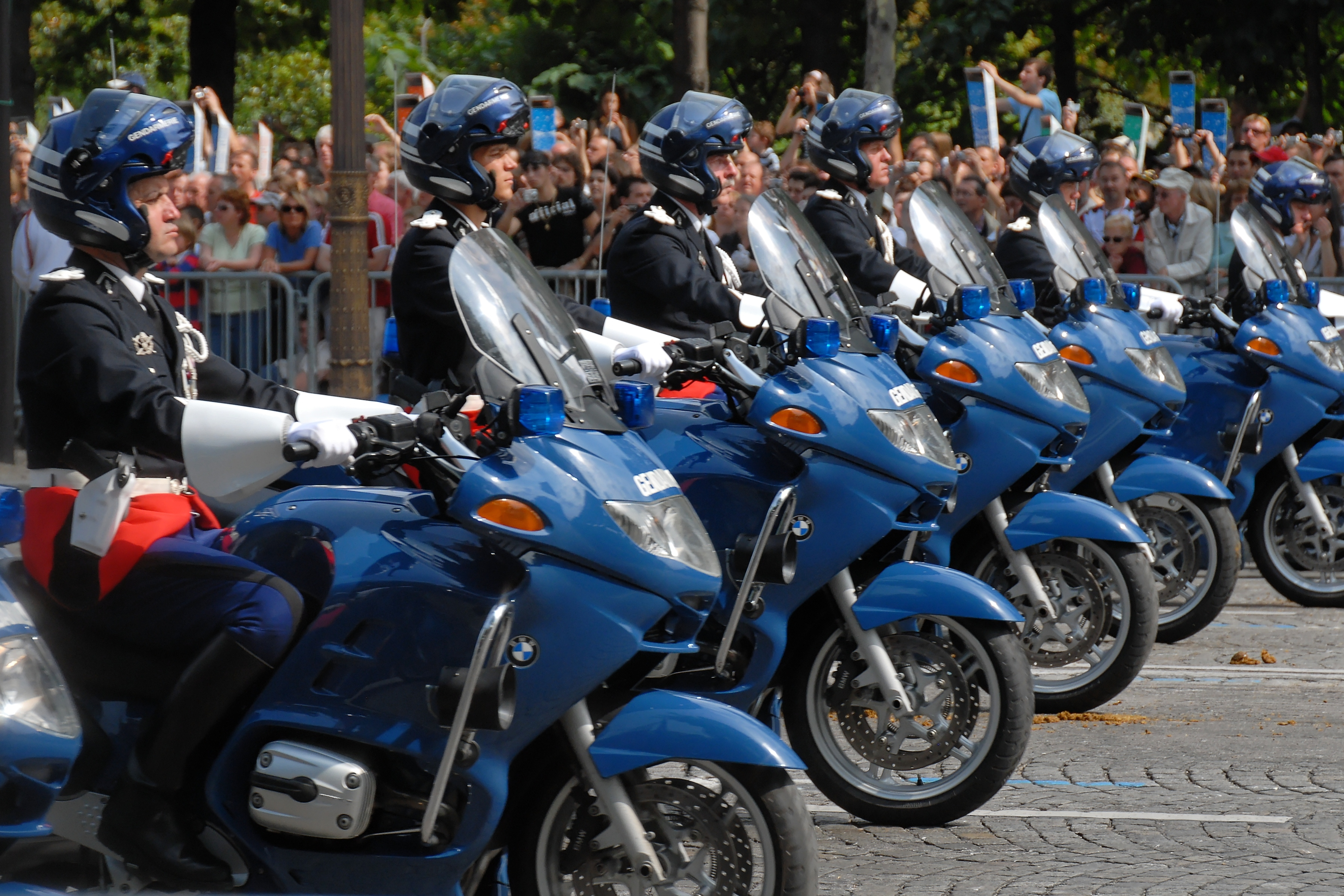
The motorbikes of the French Republican Guard open the motorised parade

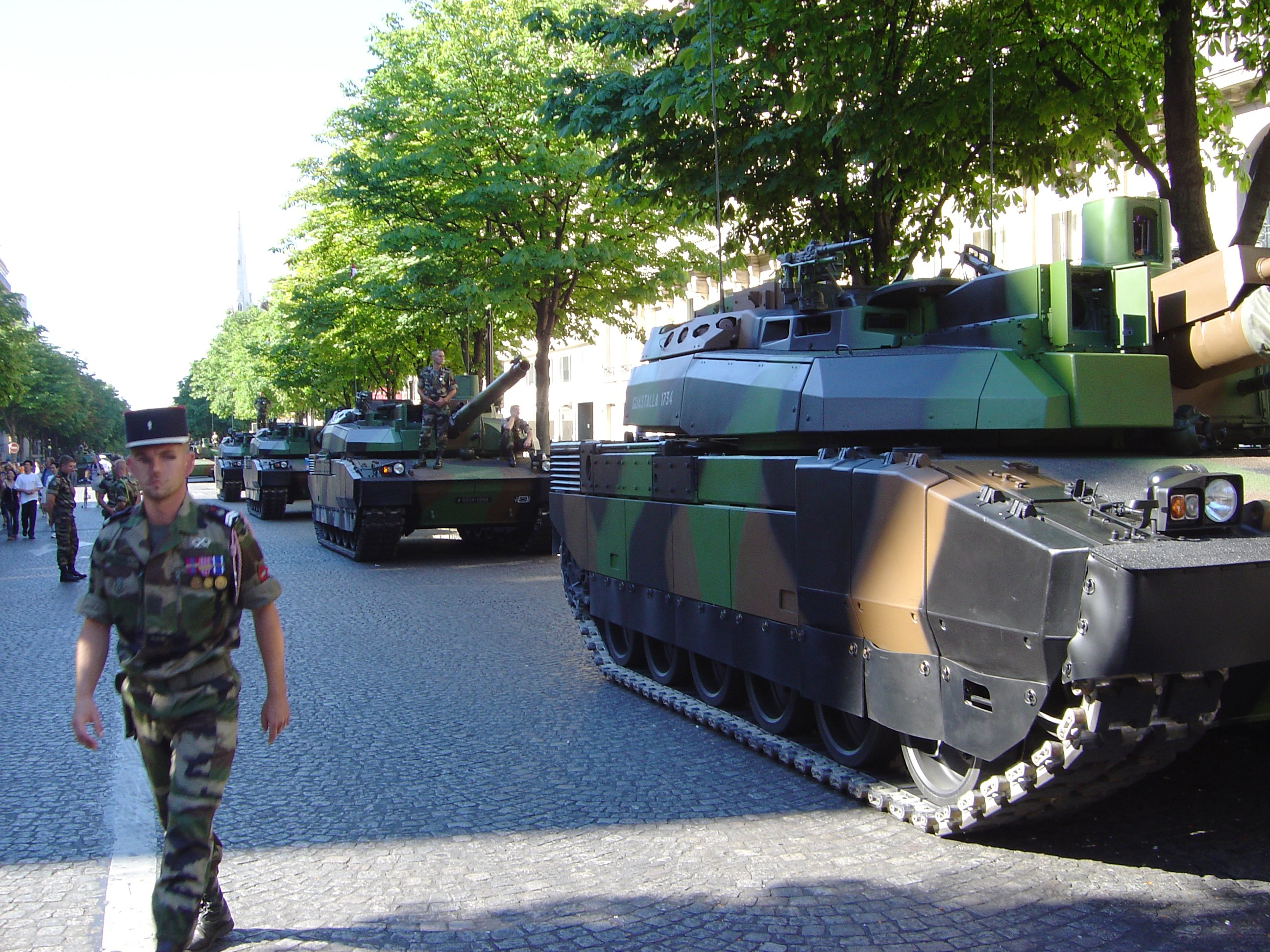
Leclerc main battle tank

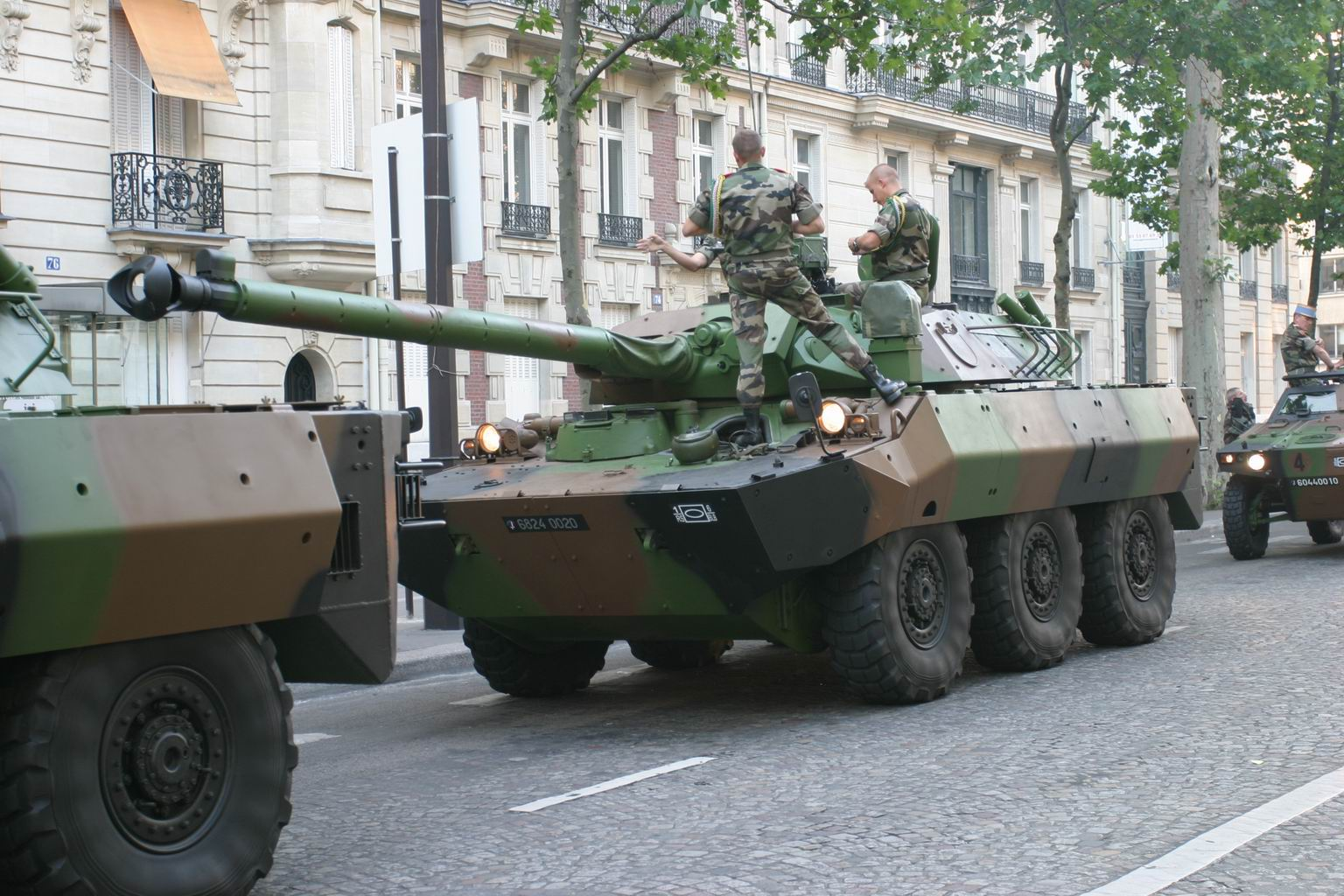
AMX 10 RC tank destroyer

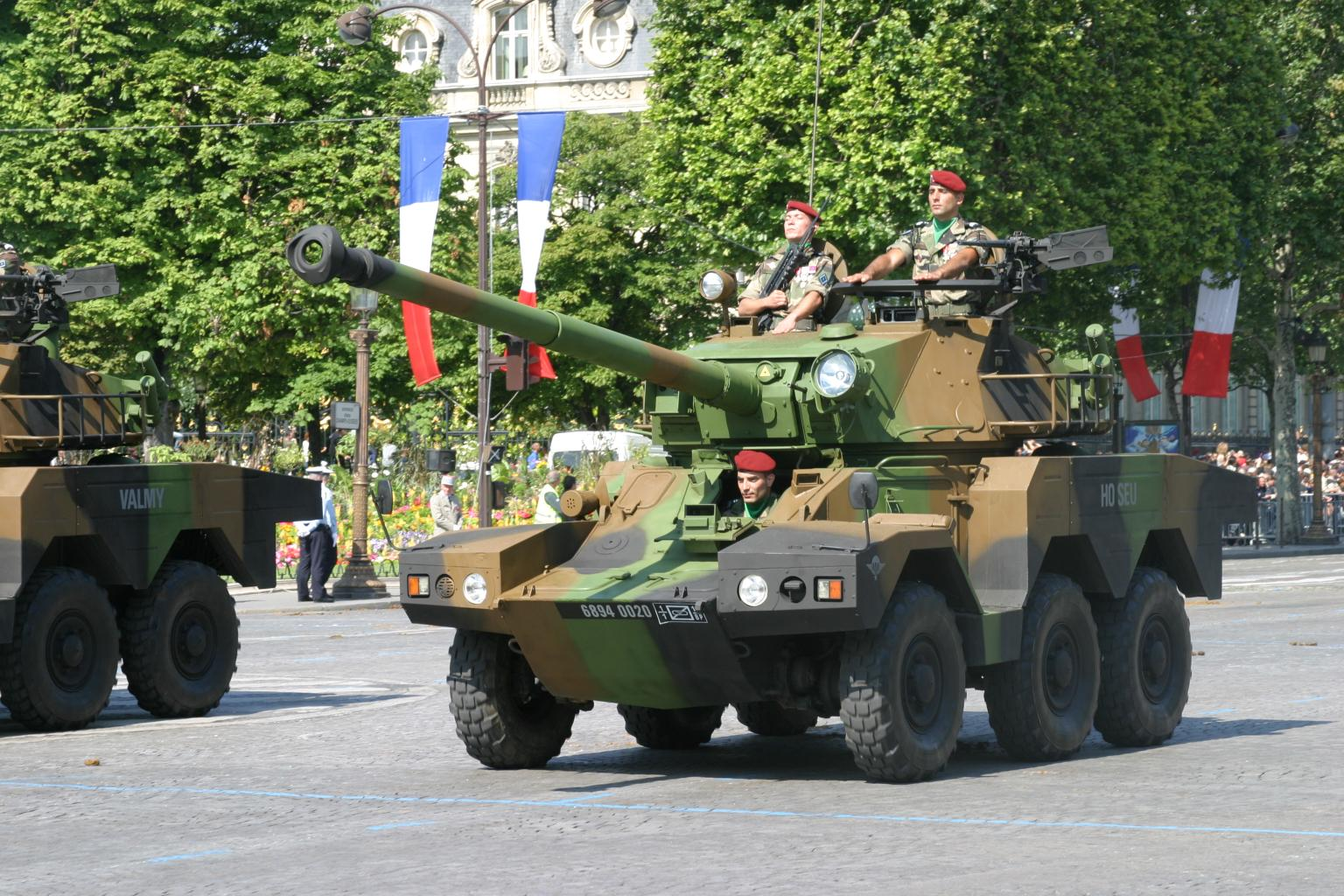
ERC 90 Sagaie light tank

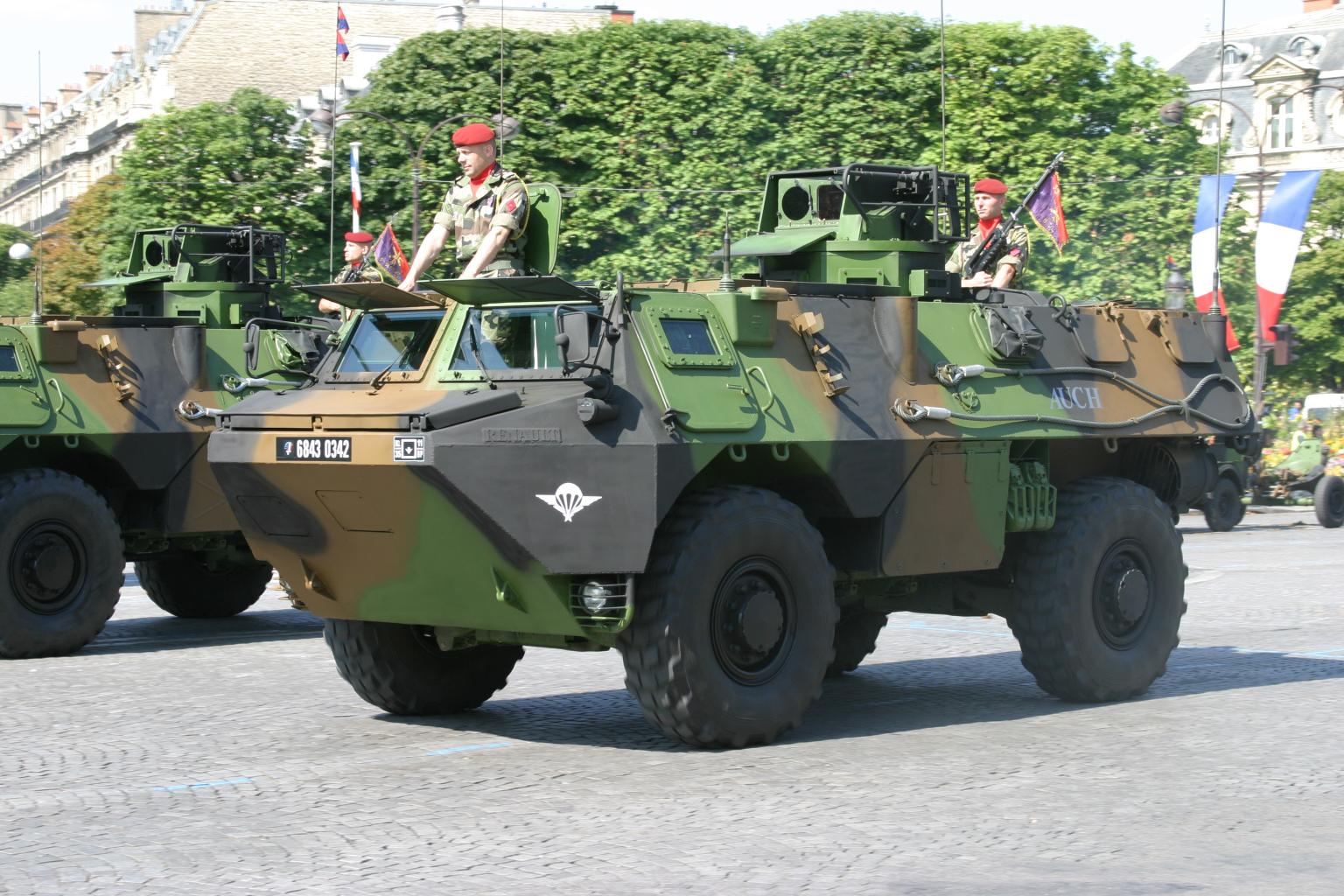
VAB armoured support vehicle

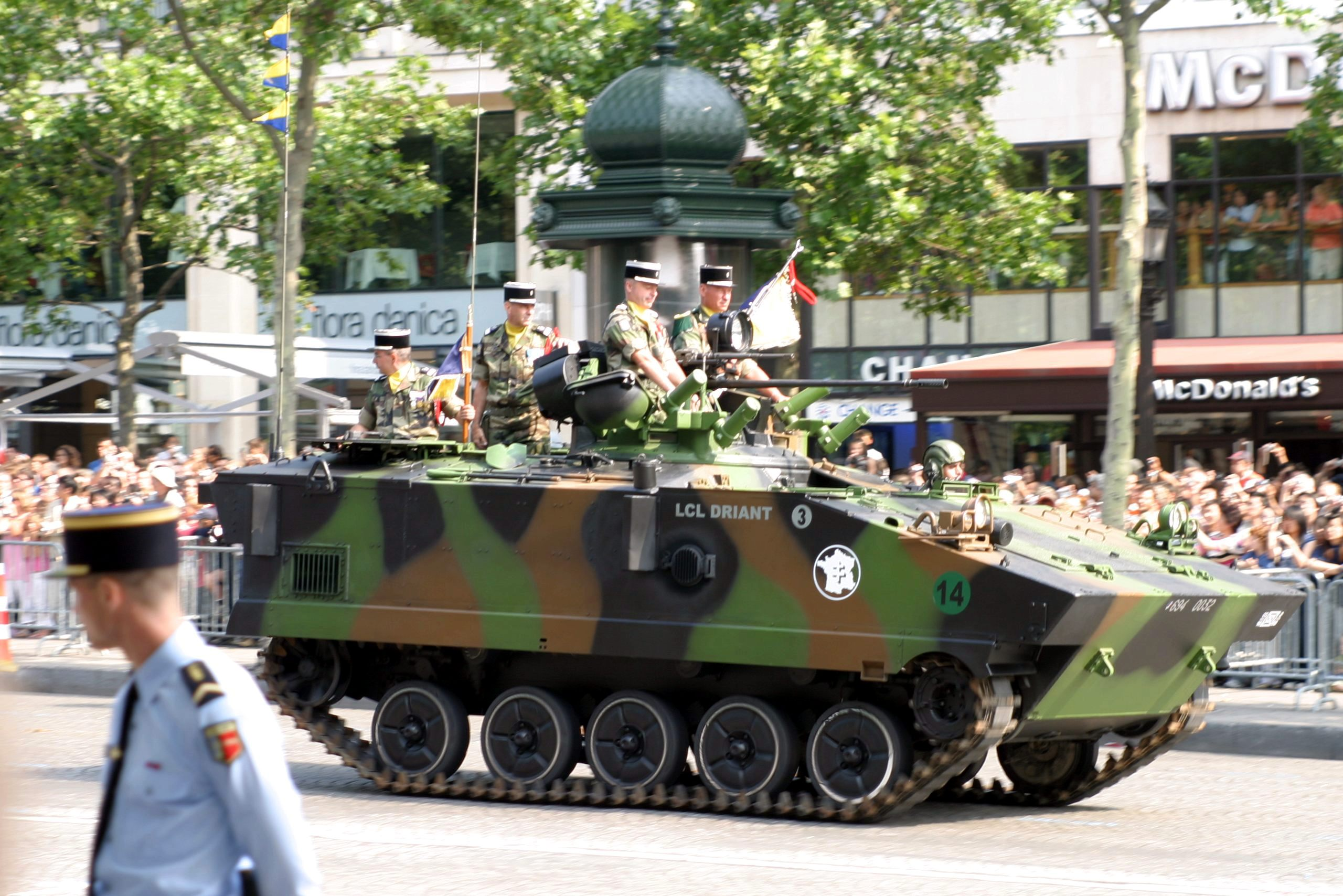
AMX-10P, infantry fighting vehicle

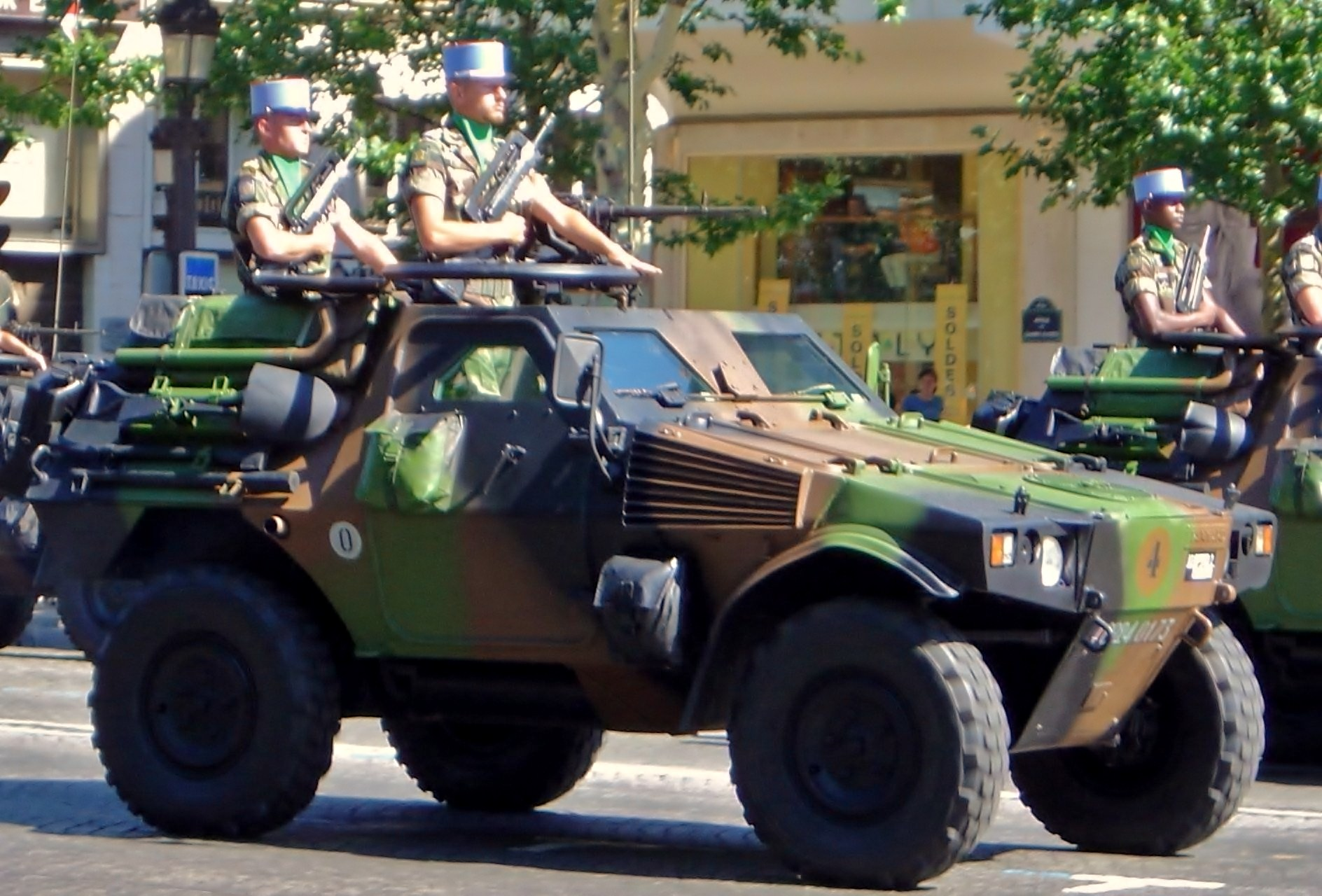
VBL Armoured light vehicle

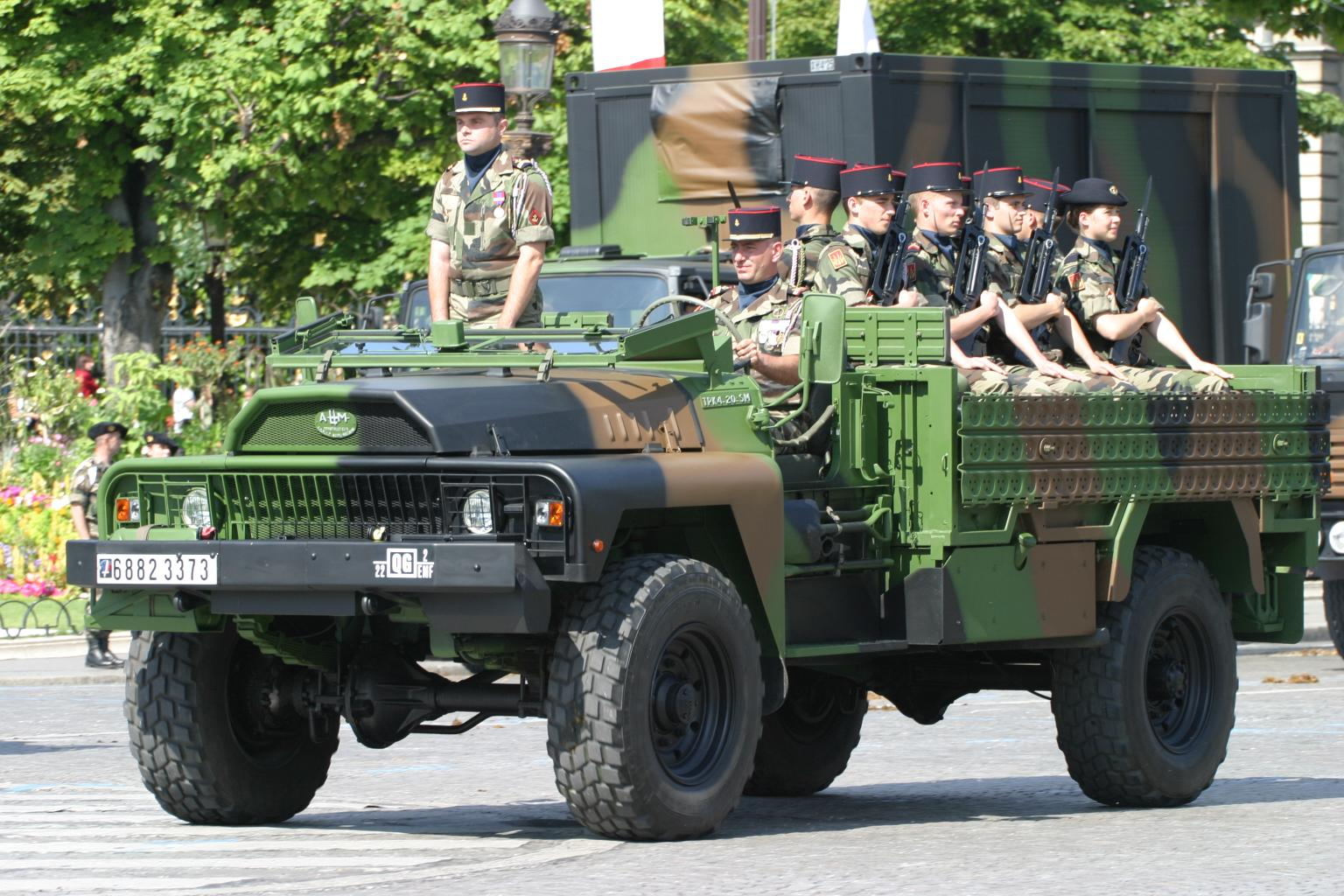
ACMAT troop transport

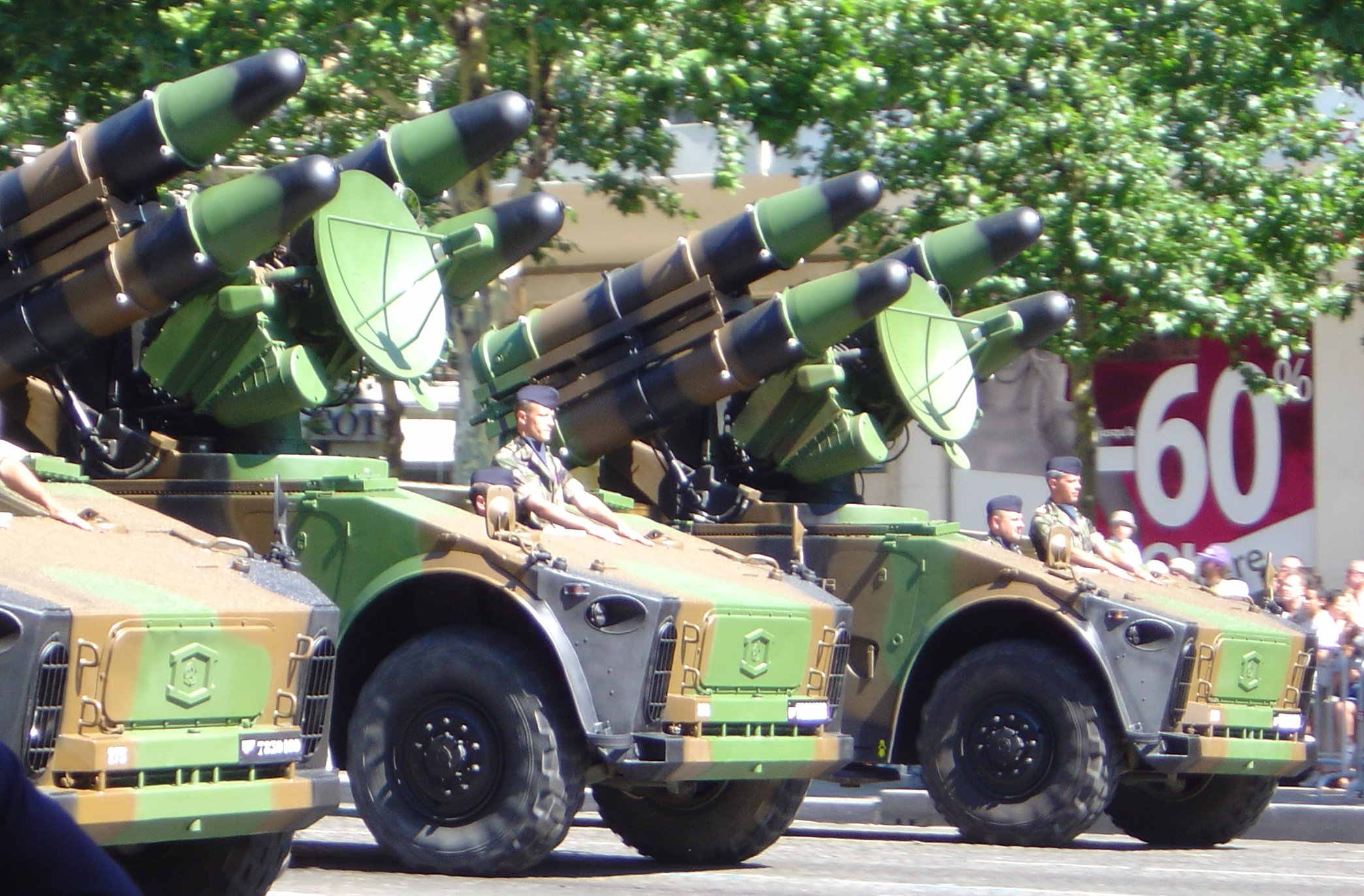
Crotale missile launchers

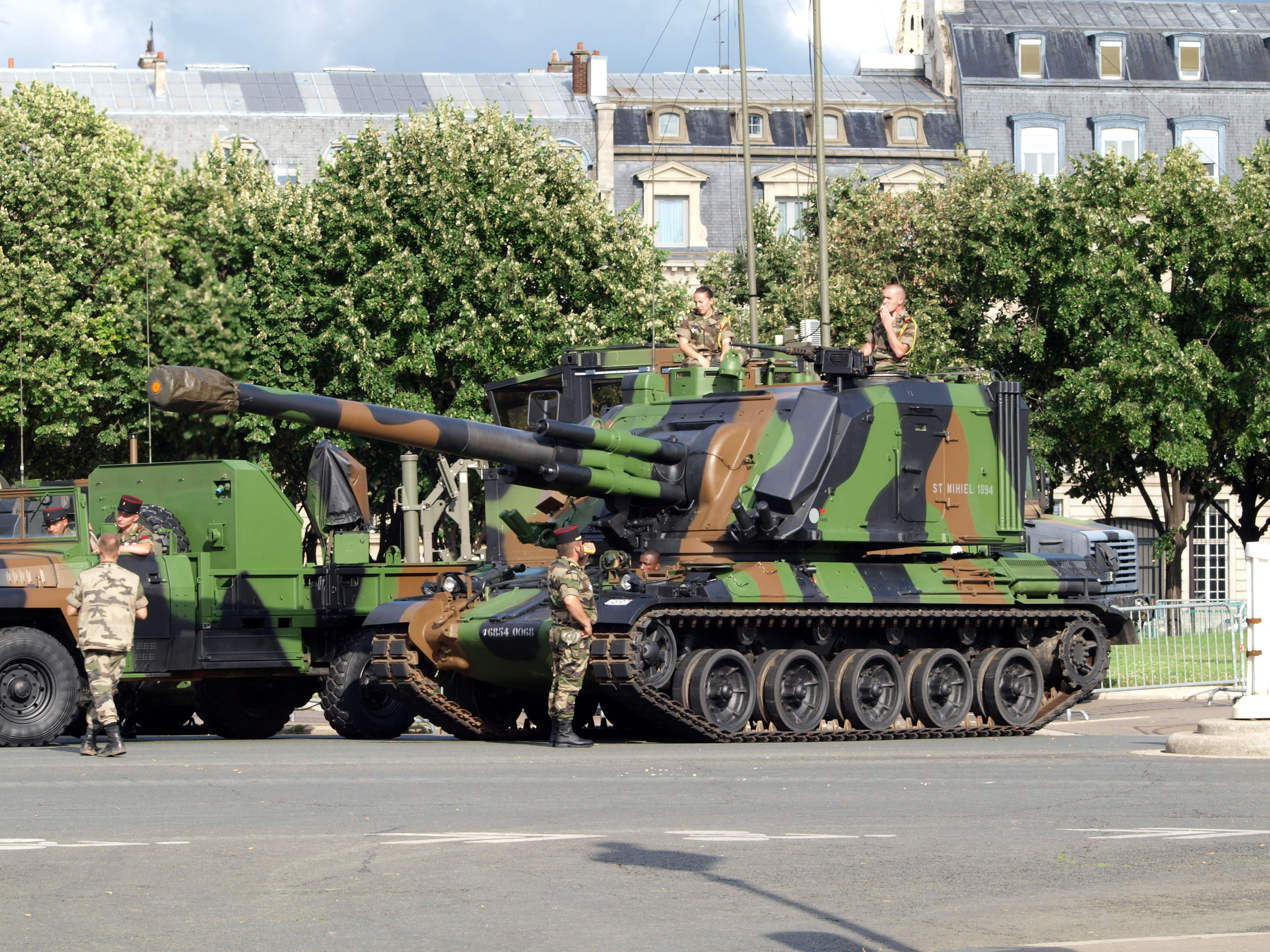
GCT 155mm self-propelled artillery vehicle

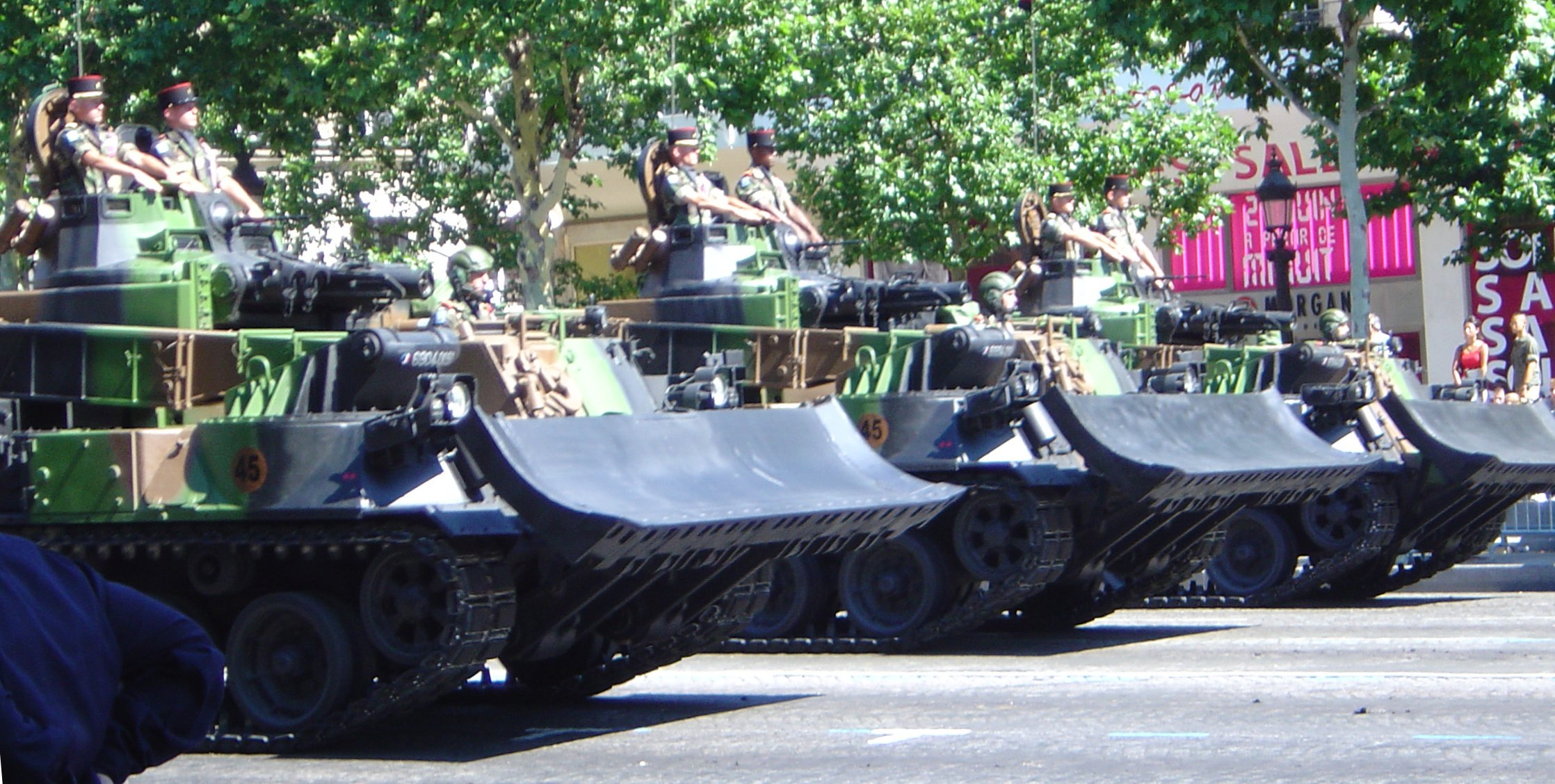
Armored bulldozer of the Génie

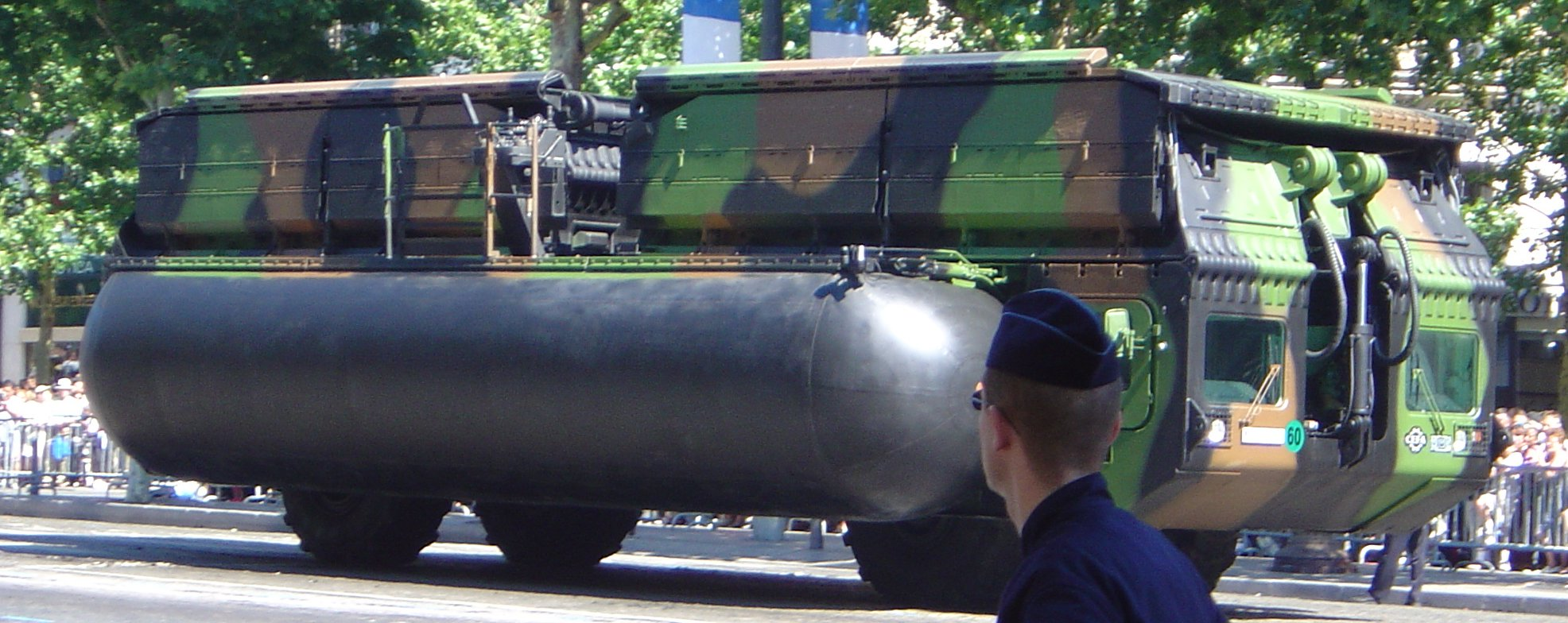
EFA mobile bridge

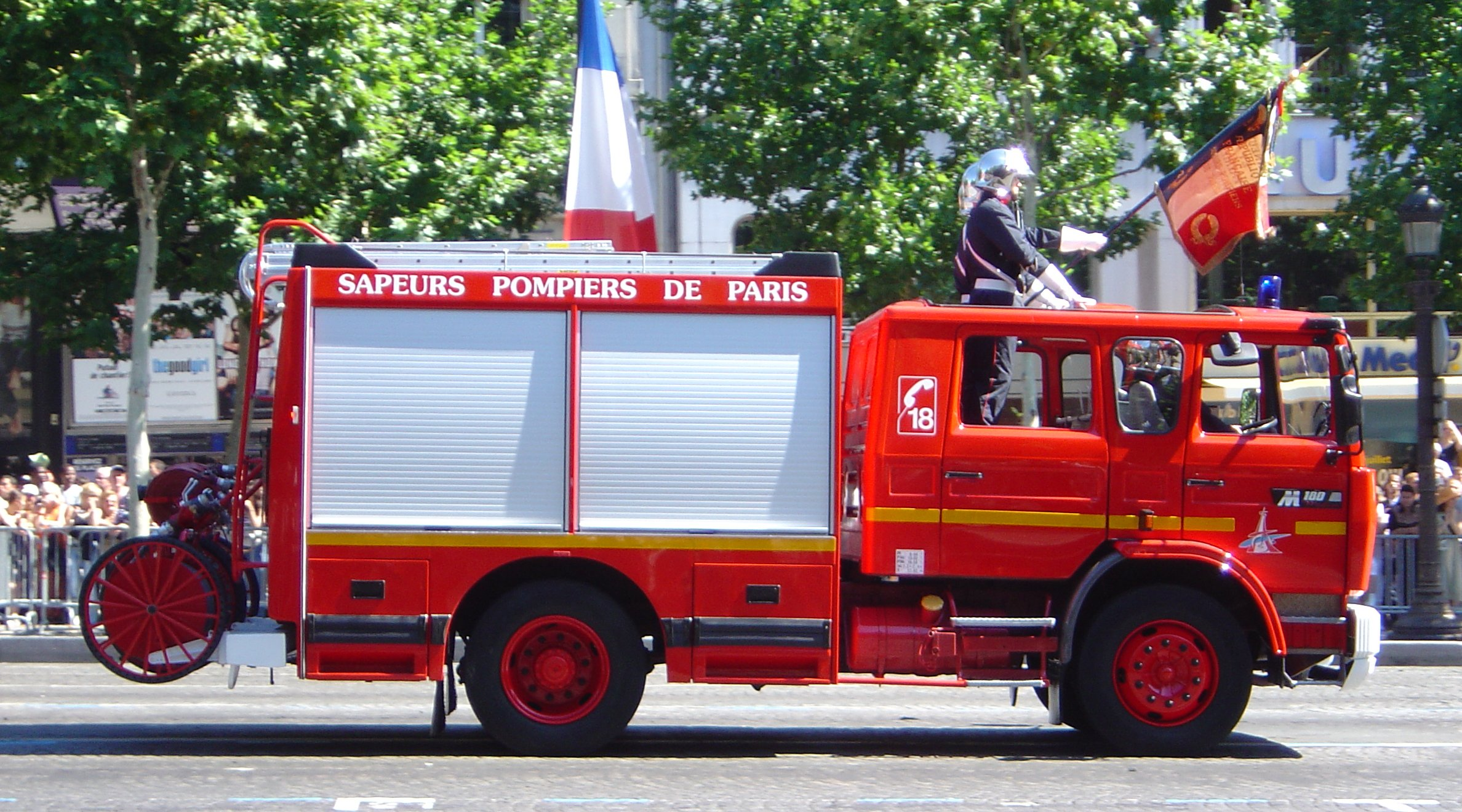
The Paris Fire Brigade closing the motorised parade

=== Air parade ===
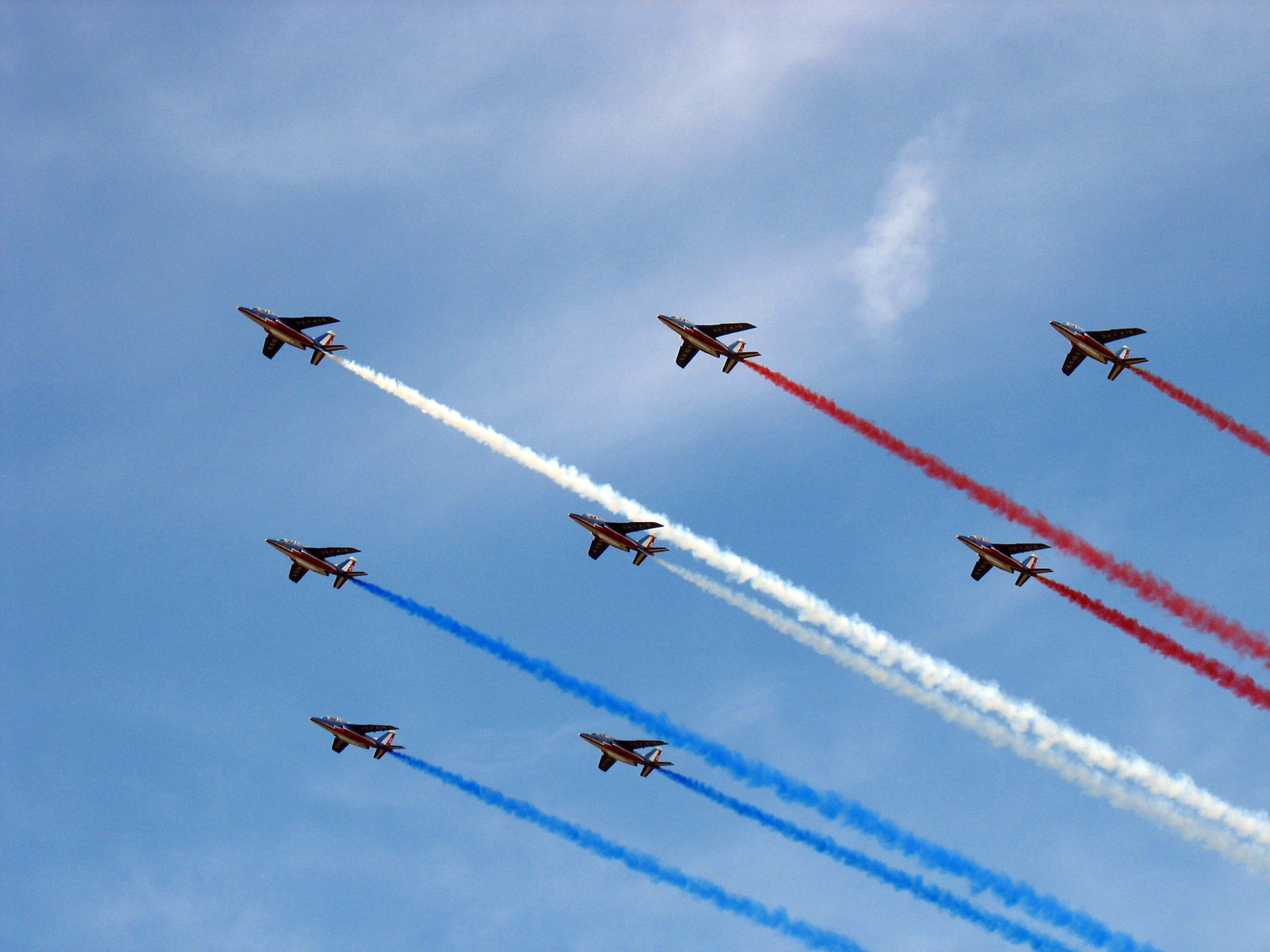
The Patrouille de France's Alphajets

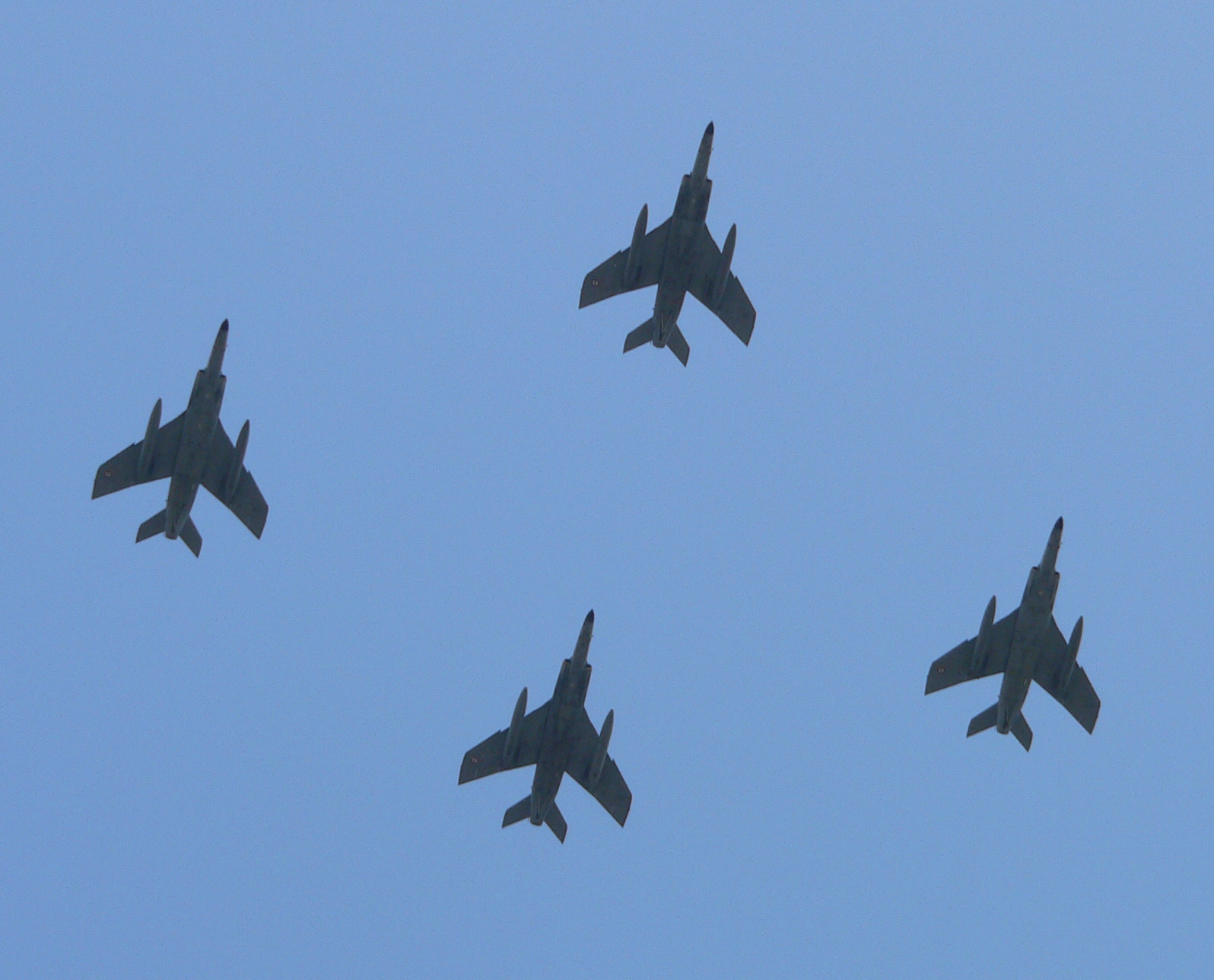
Four Super Étendards

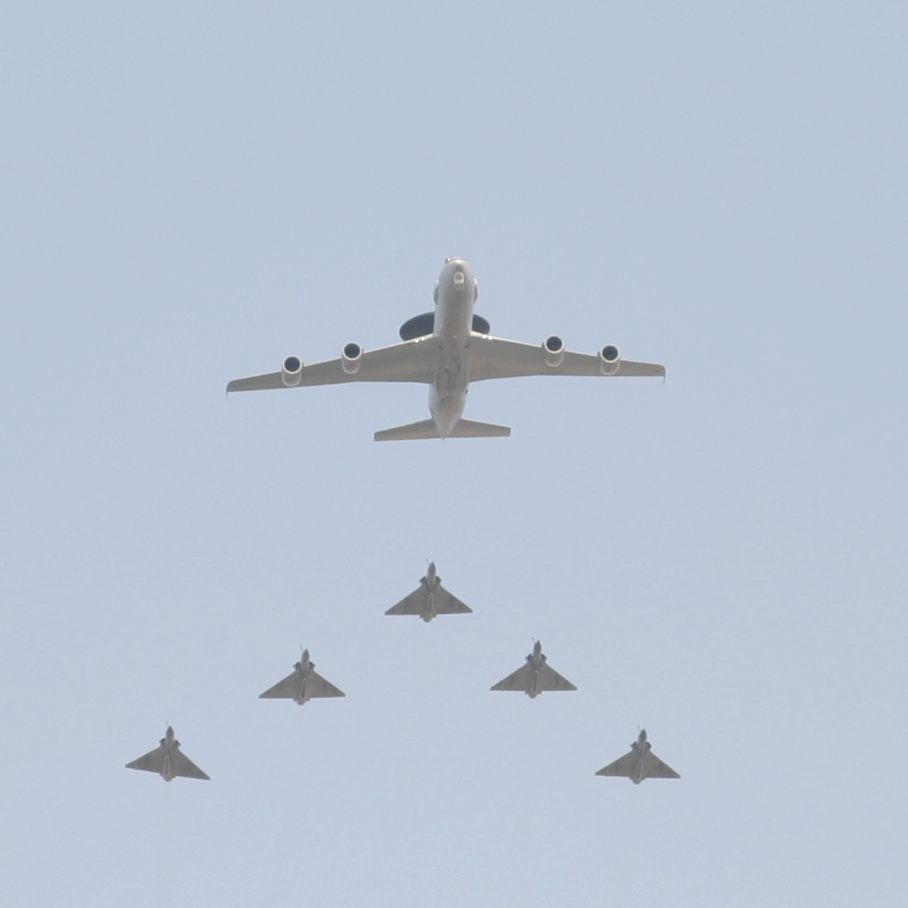
A Boeing E-3 Sentry (AWACS) followed by five Mirages 2000

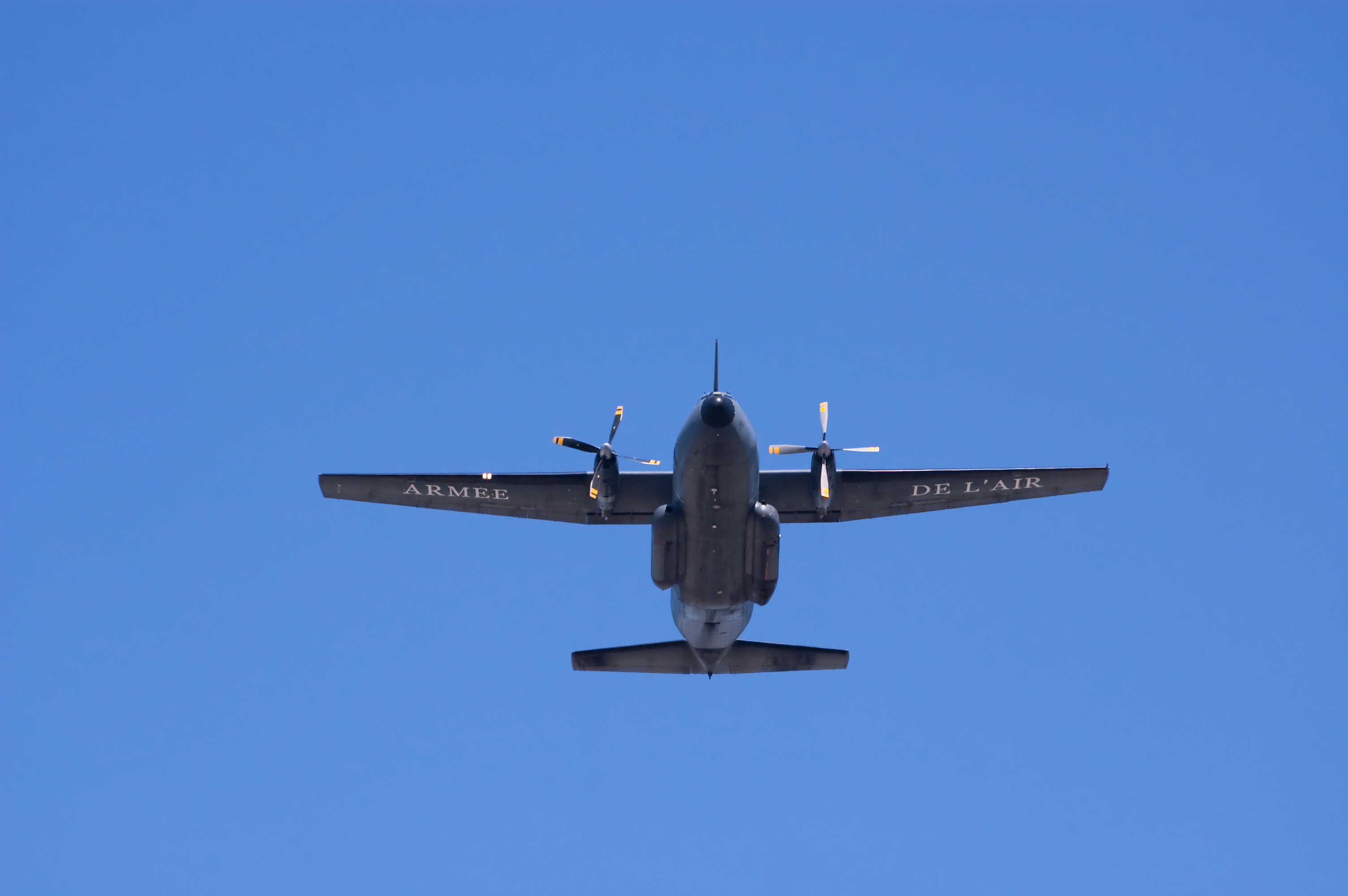
C-160 Transall

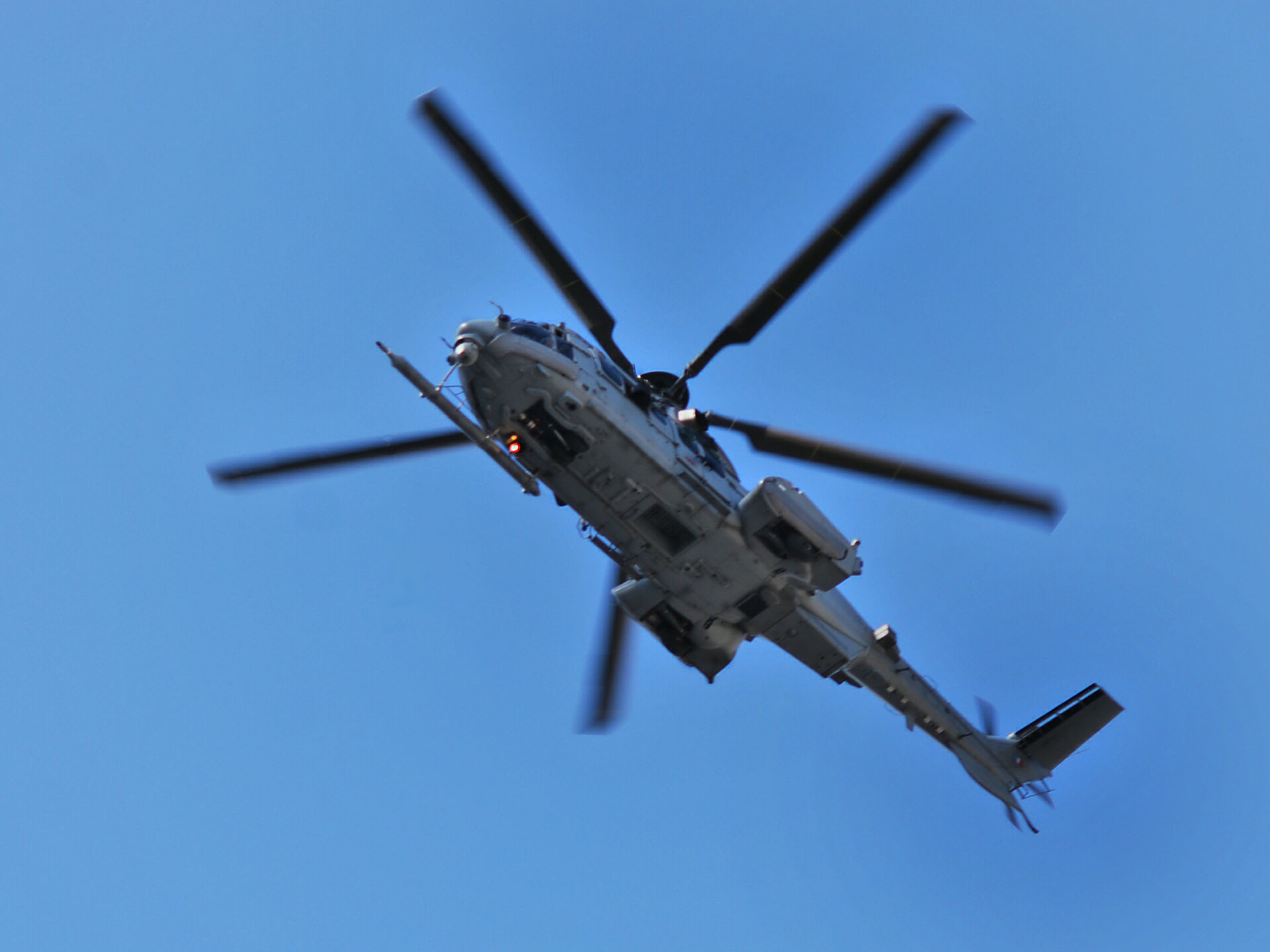
Eurocopter EC725

=== Local parades ===
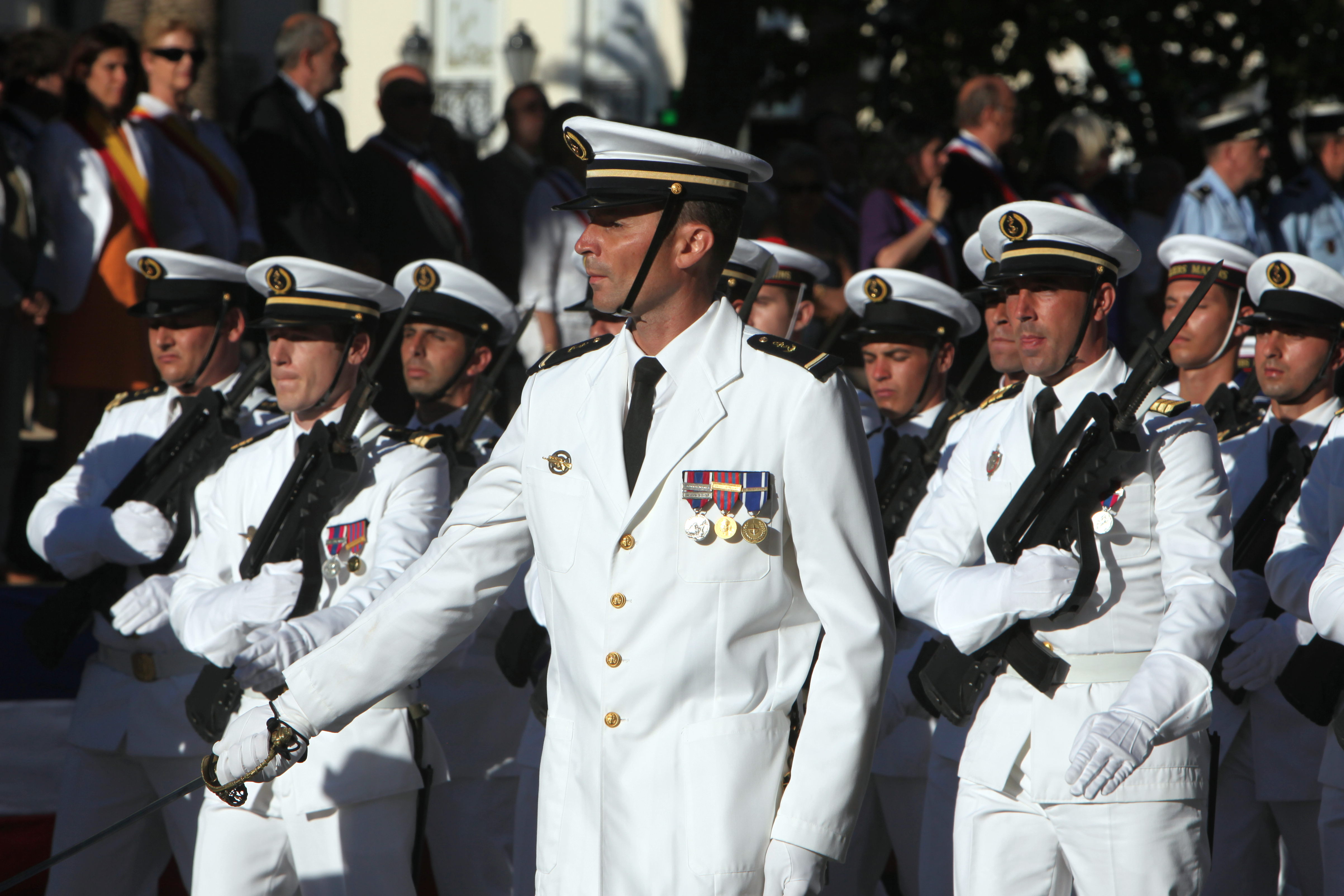
Fusiliers-marins from Toulon naval base parading in Toulon.

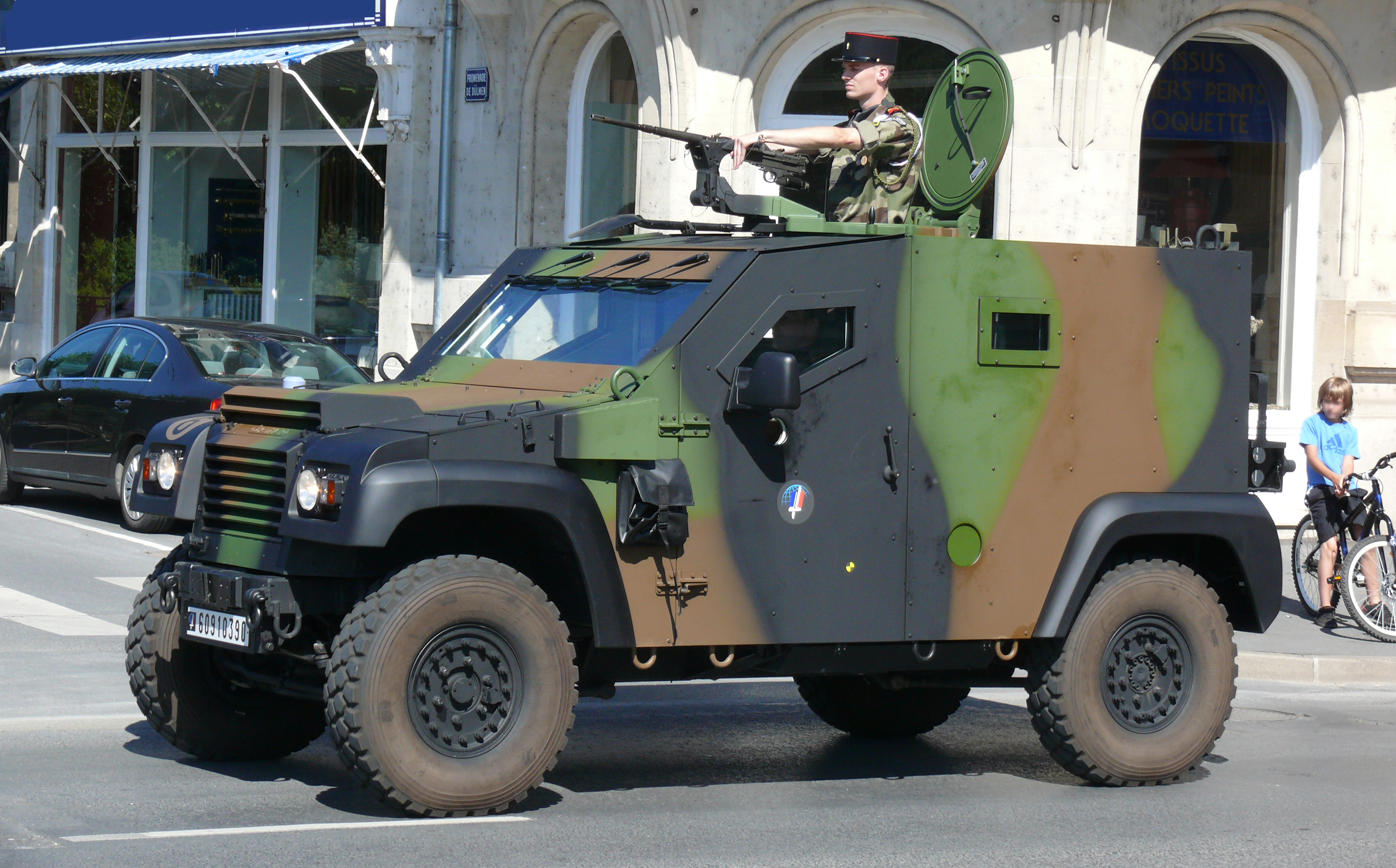
PVP of the 3rd regiment engineers, 1st Mechanised Brigade in Charleville-Mézières

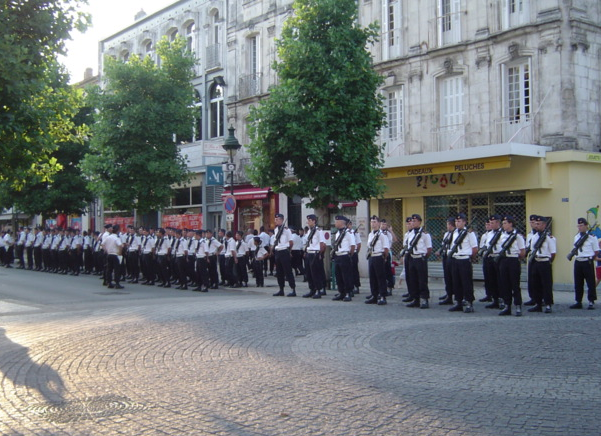
French Air Force riflemen in Rochefort.

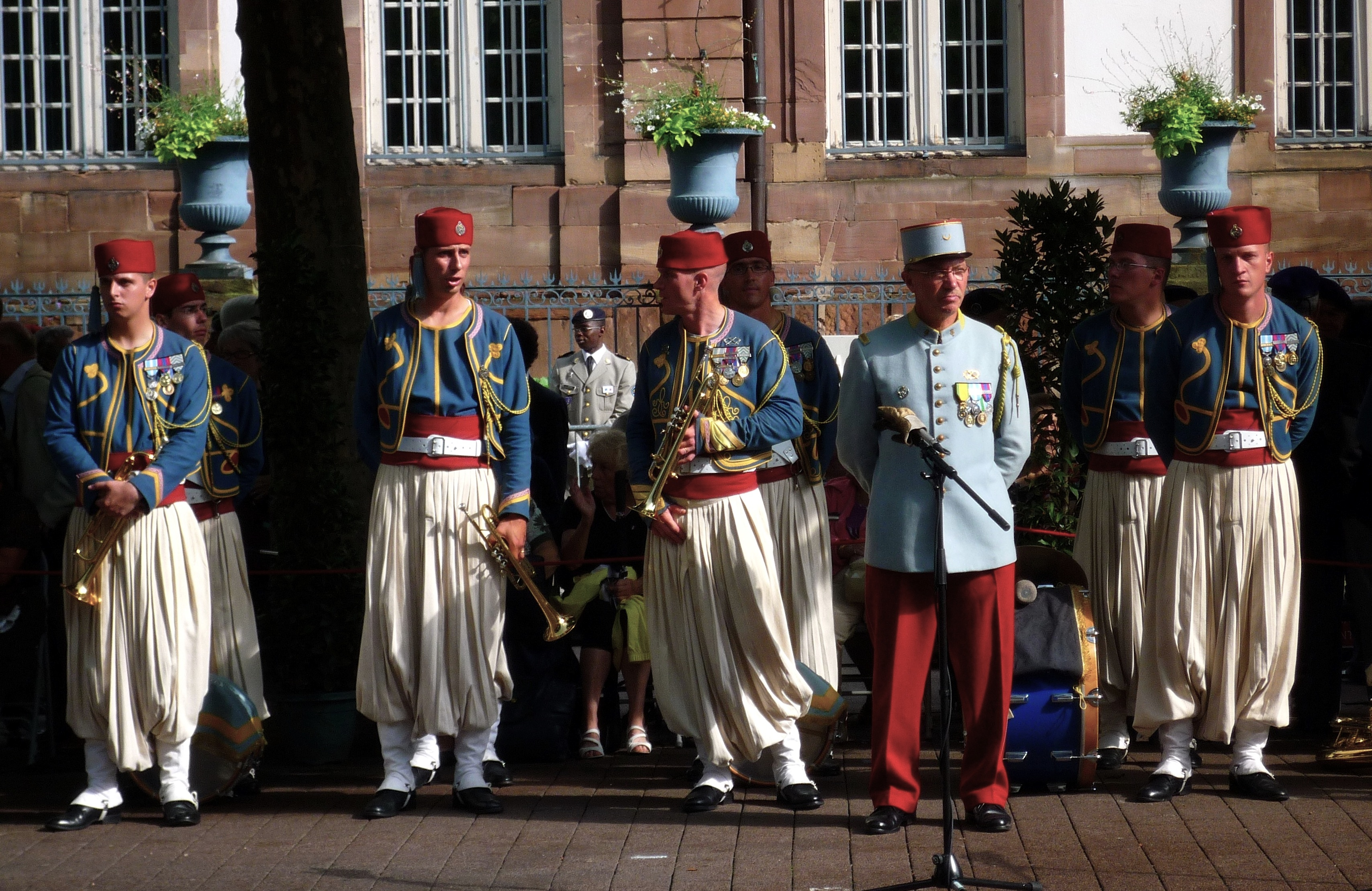
1st Tirailleurs of Épinal regiment displaying late 19th century uniforms for Bastille Day in Strasbourg.

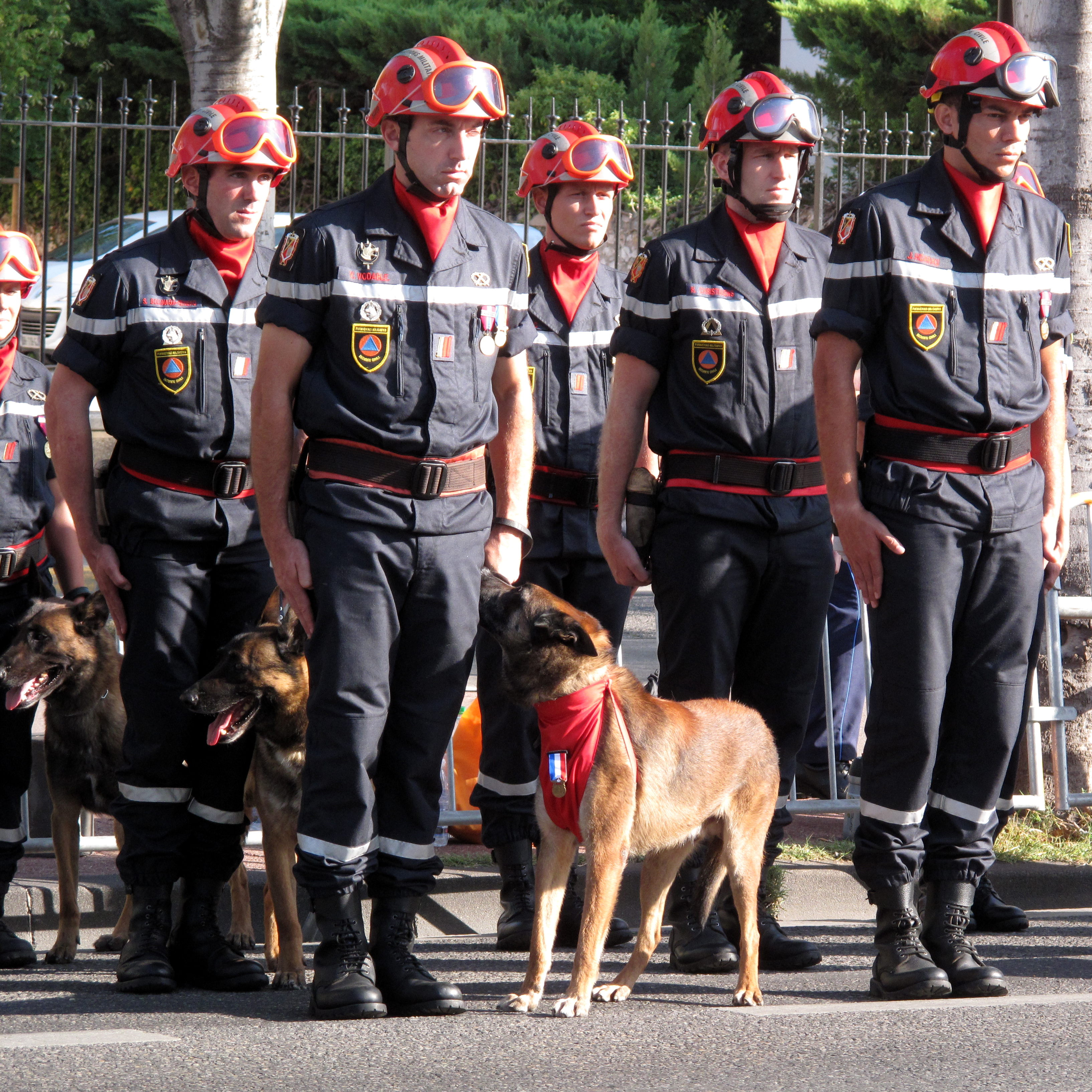
Cynotechnical unit of the Marseille Naval Fire Battalion during the military parade of 14 July 2012 in Marseille, with a decorated dog.

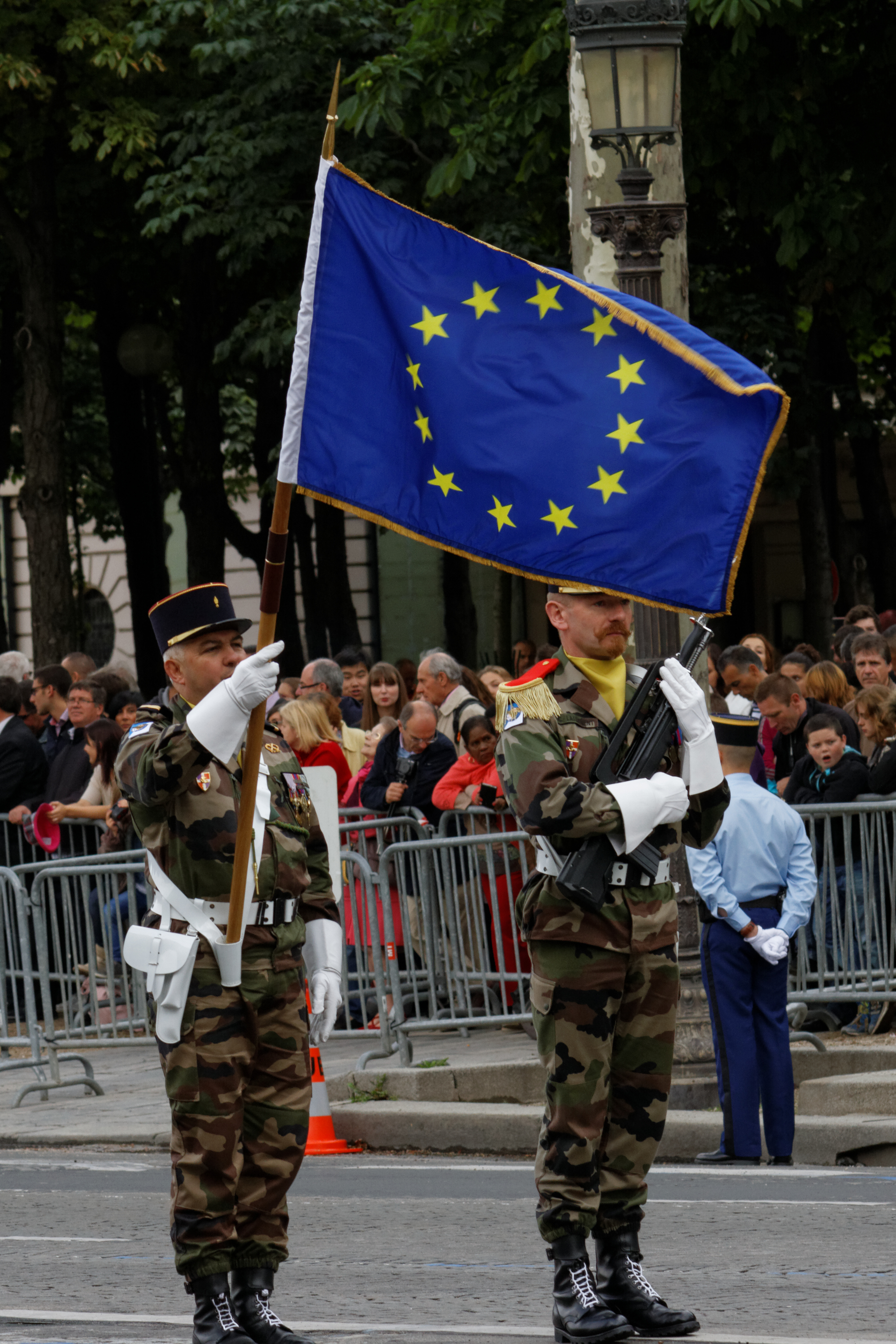
European Union in Bastille Day military parade of 2014 in Paris, France.

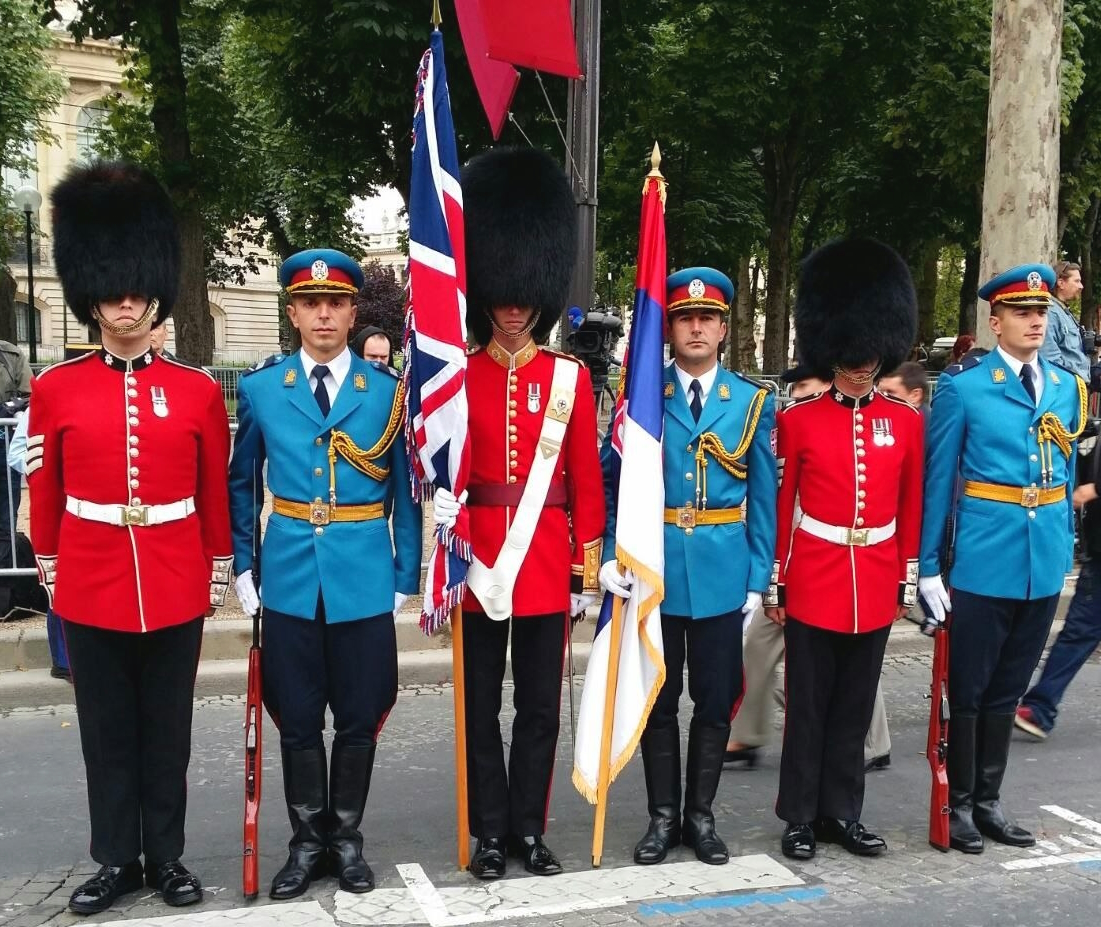
Serbian and British armies in Bastille Day military parade of 2013 in Paris, France.

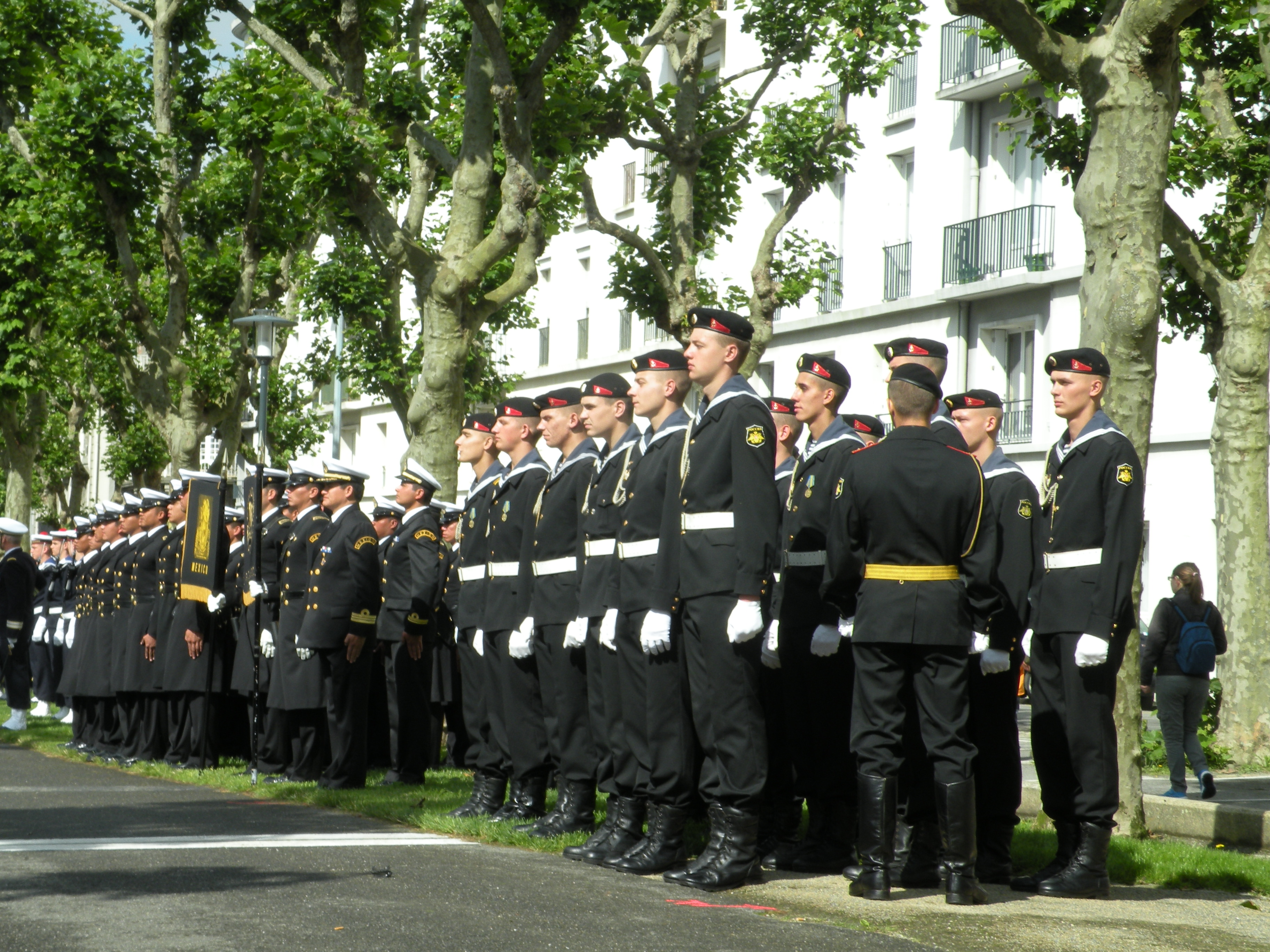
Russian and Mexican sailors during the military parade of 14 July 2012 in Brest.

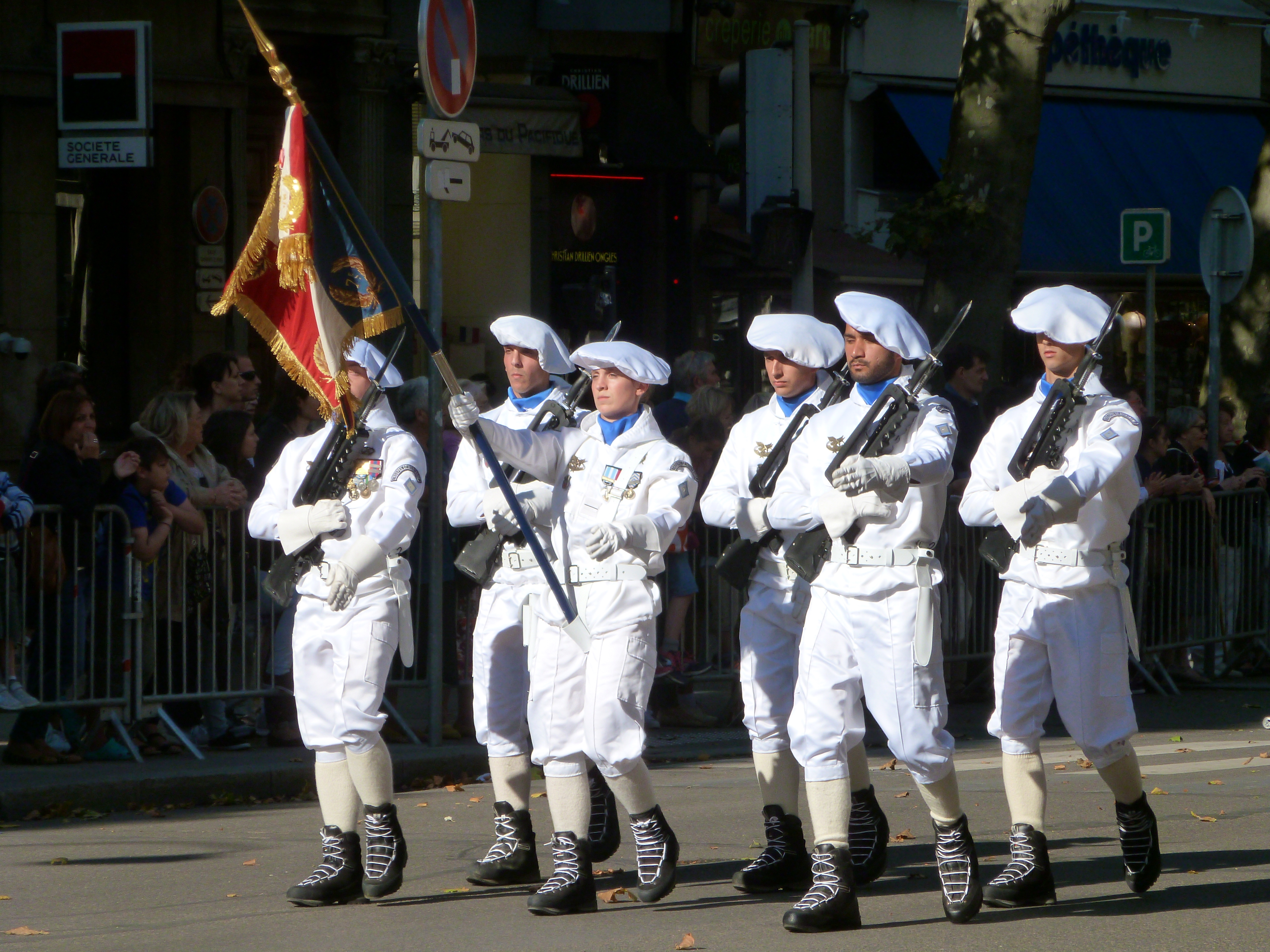
7th Battalion of the Chasseurs Alpins during Bastille Day parade in Lyon.

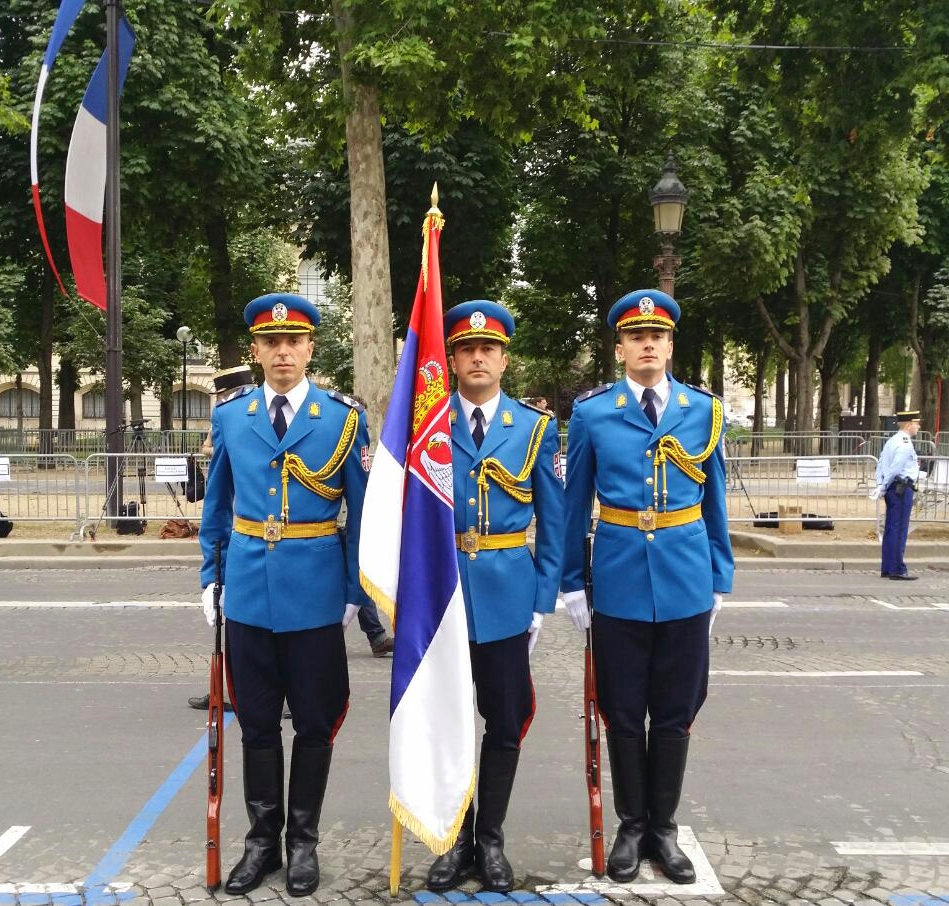
Serbian National Guard in Bastille Day military parade of 2014 in Paris, France.

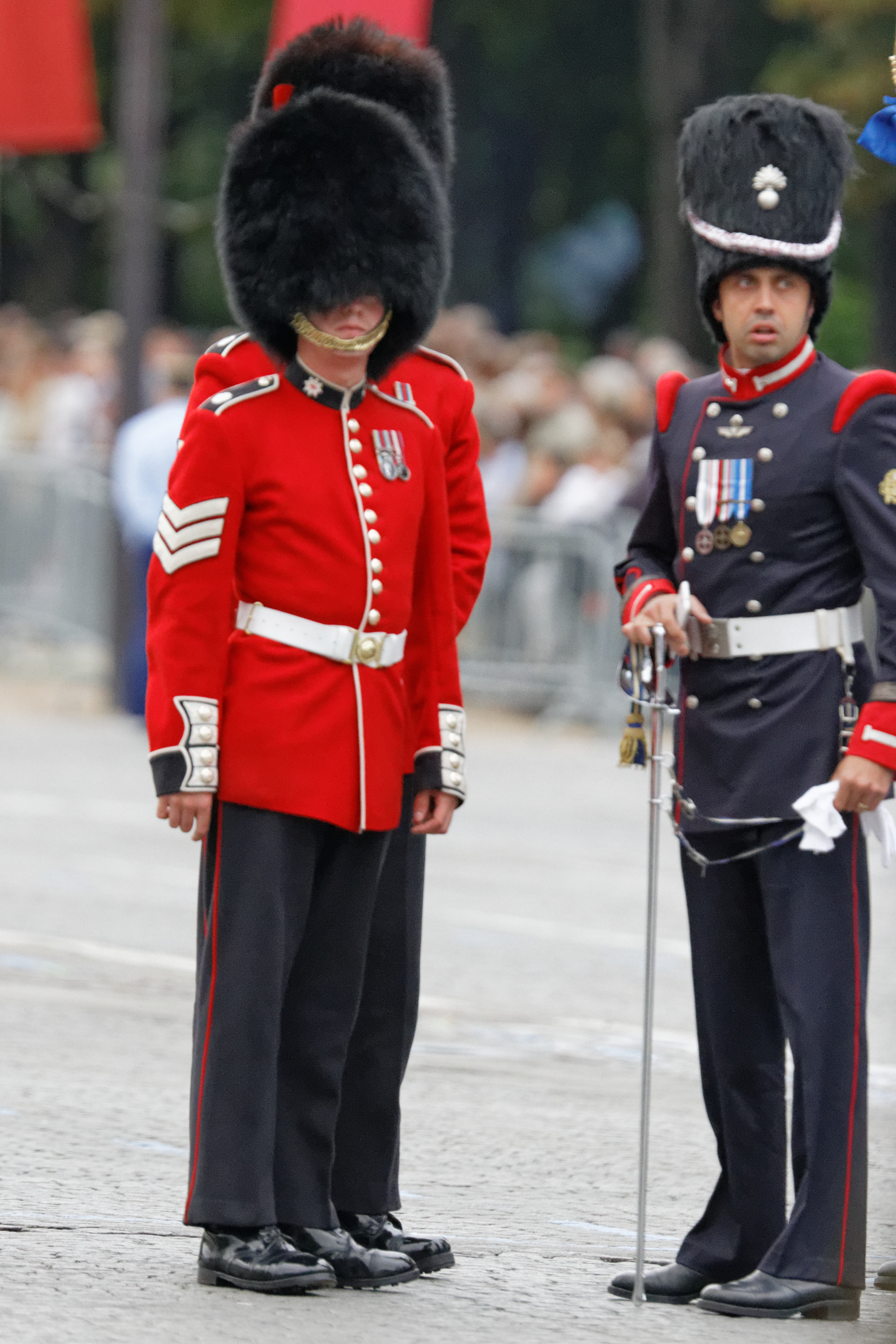
England and Italy guard armies in Bastille Day military parade of 2014 in Paris, France.

=== Foreign guests ===
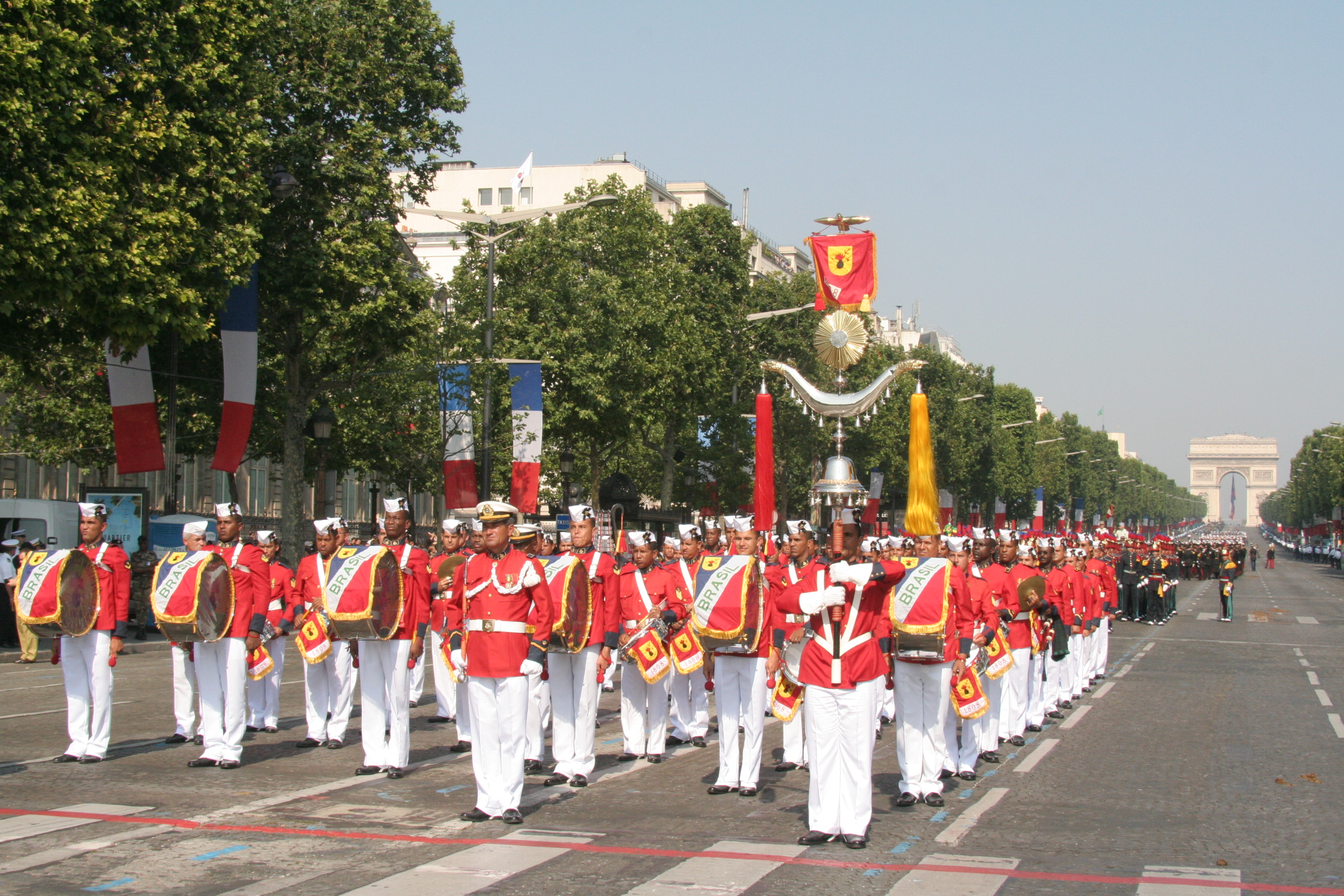
Band of the Brazilian Marines, guest participants in 2005

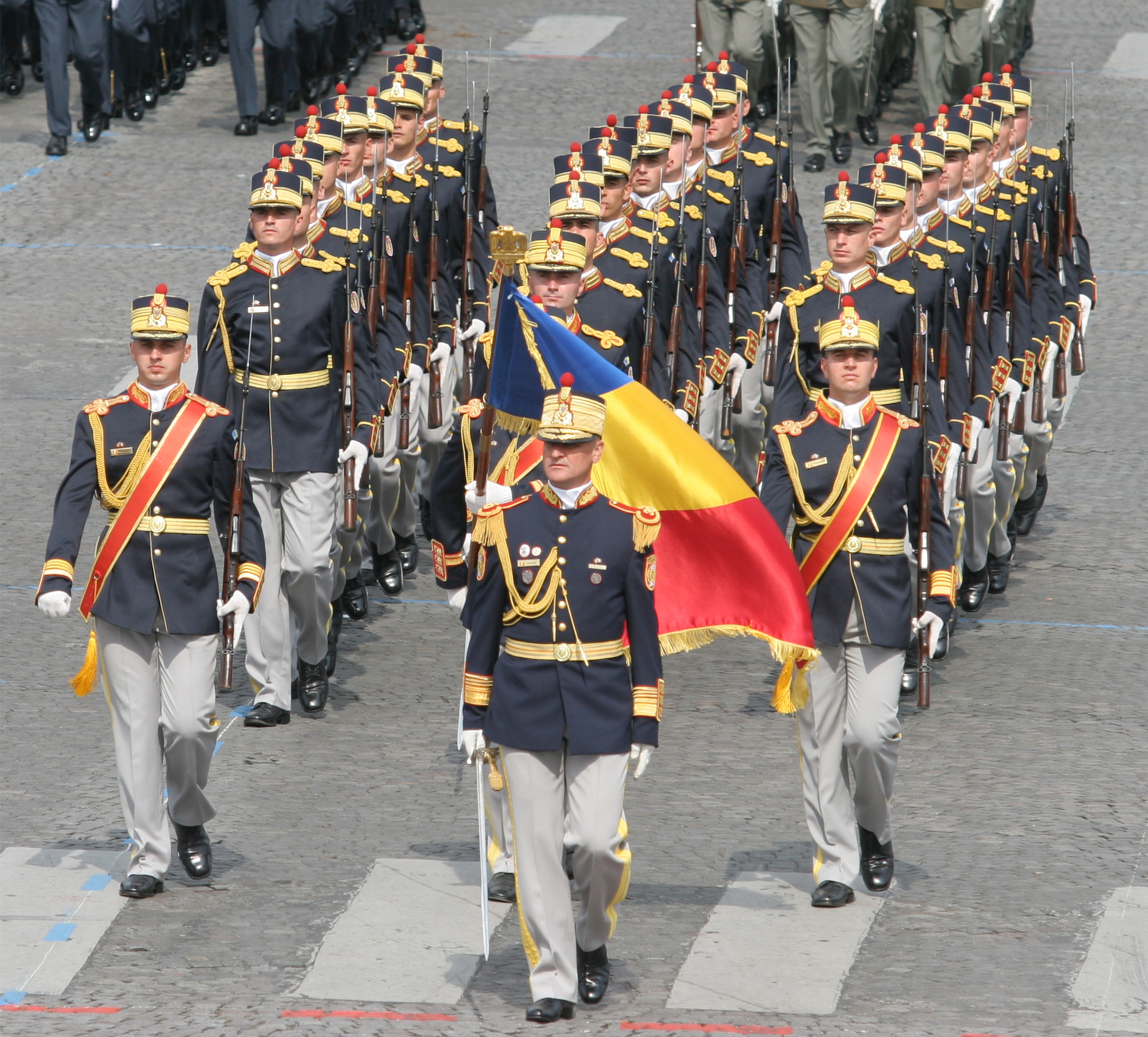
In 2007, one regiment from each European member-state paraded on the Champs-Élysées (here, the 30th regiment of the Romanian National Guard)

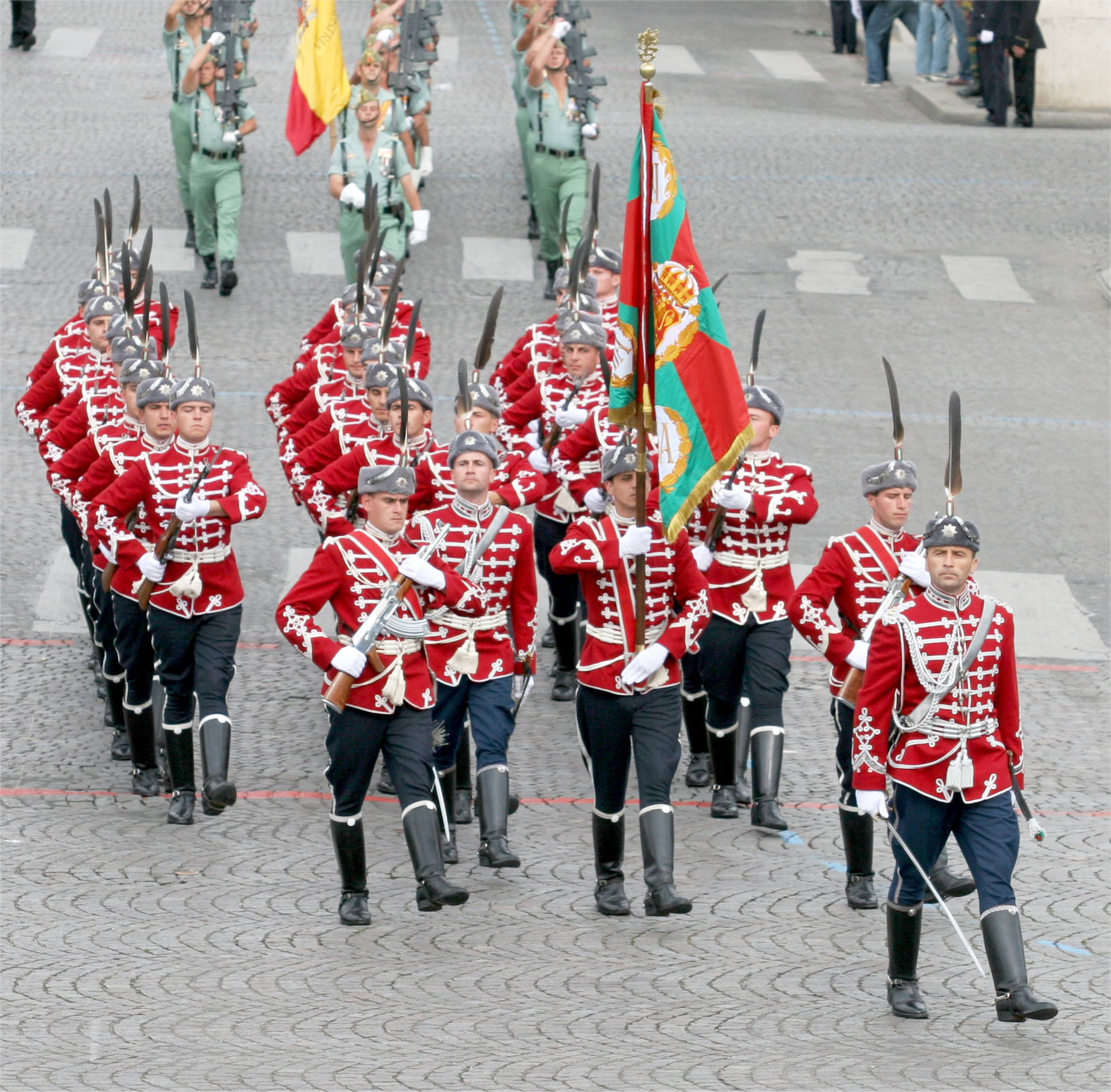
The National Guards Unit of the Bulgarian Army in 2007

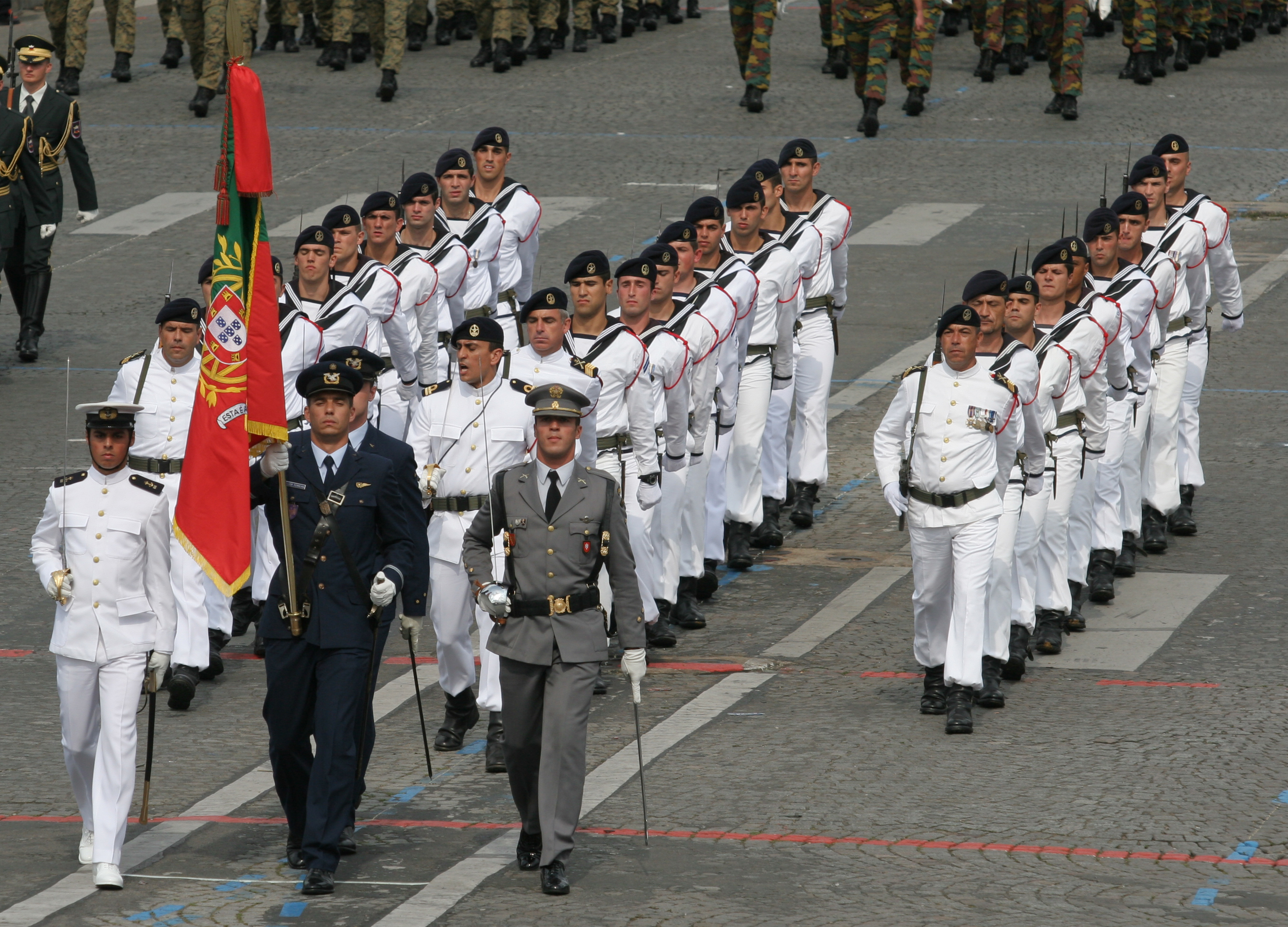
The Portuguese Marines in white dress uniform in 2007

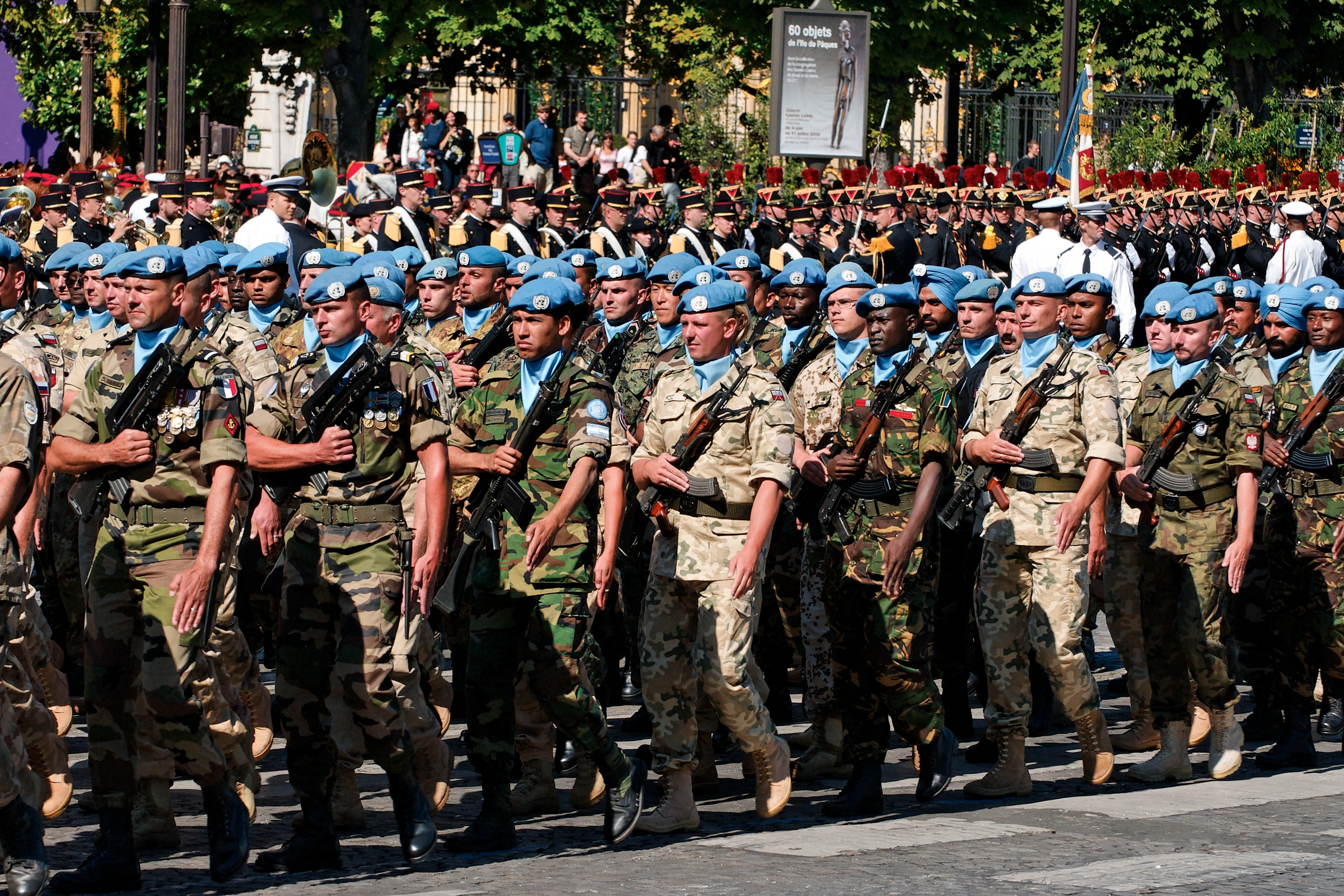
In 2008, a multinational United Nations battalion opened the parade

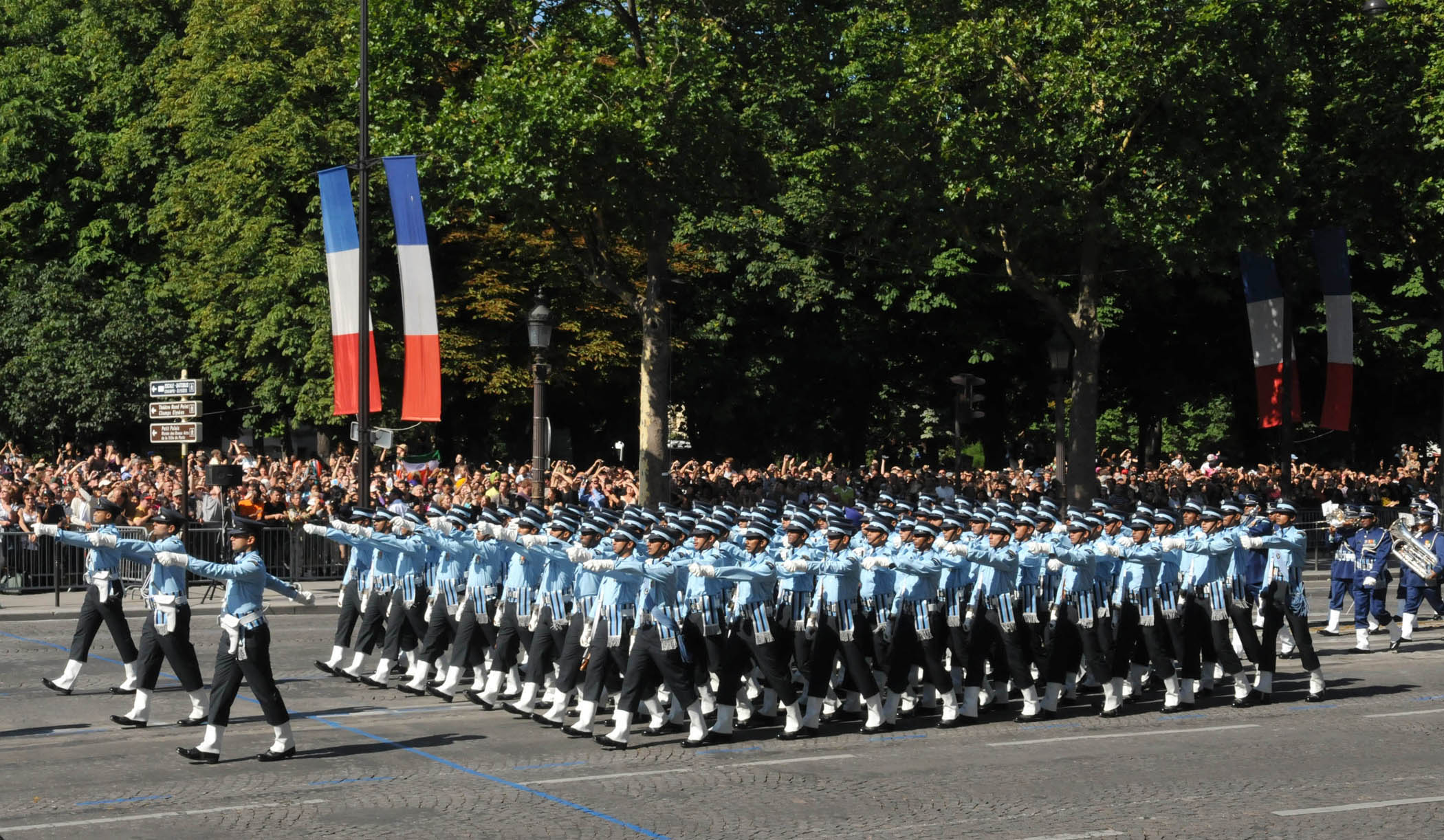
The Indian Air Force contingent, led by the India's oldest regiment, the Maratha Light Infantry, guest participants in 2009.

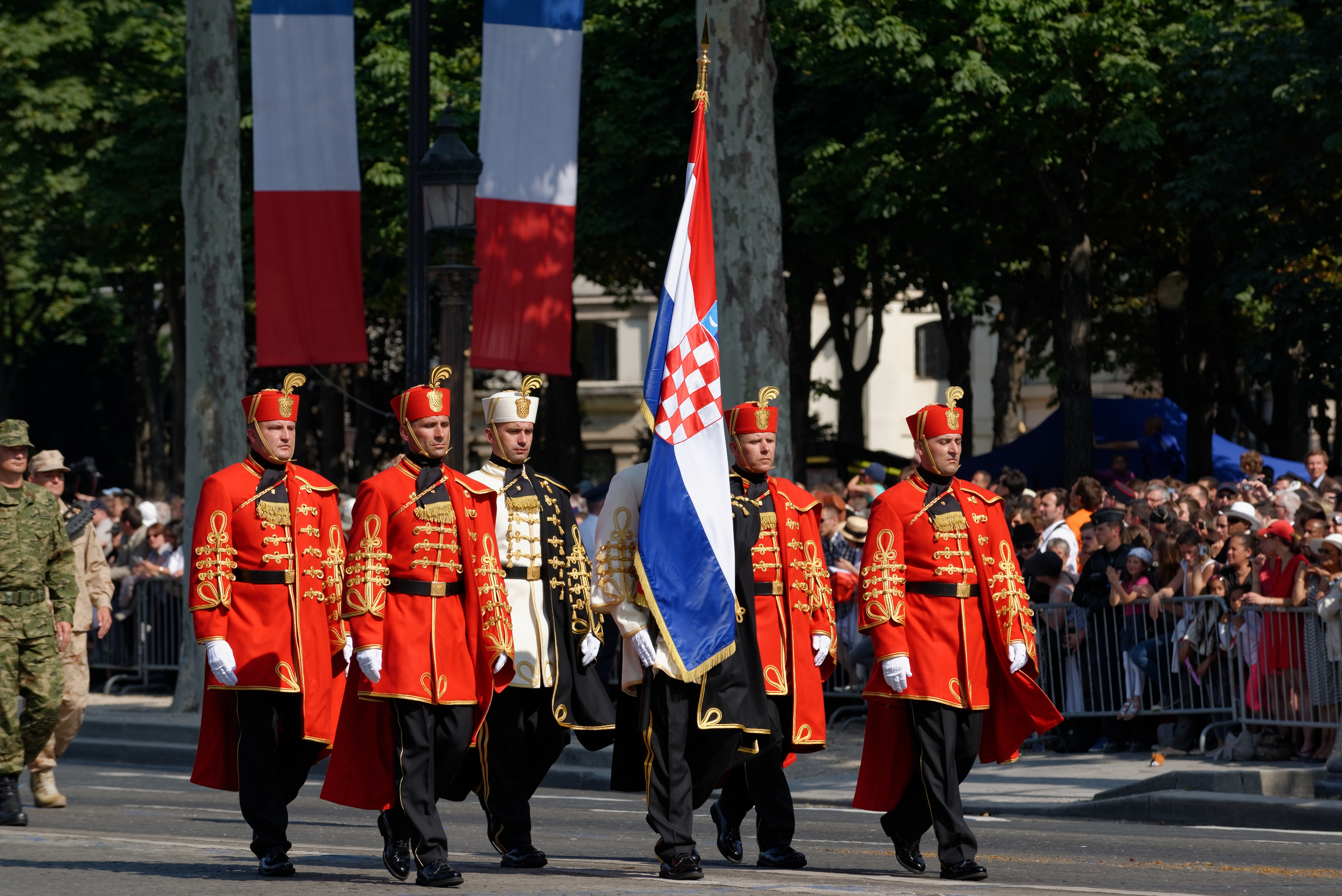
Croatian Honor Guard Battalion guest participants in 2013.

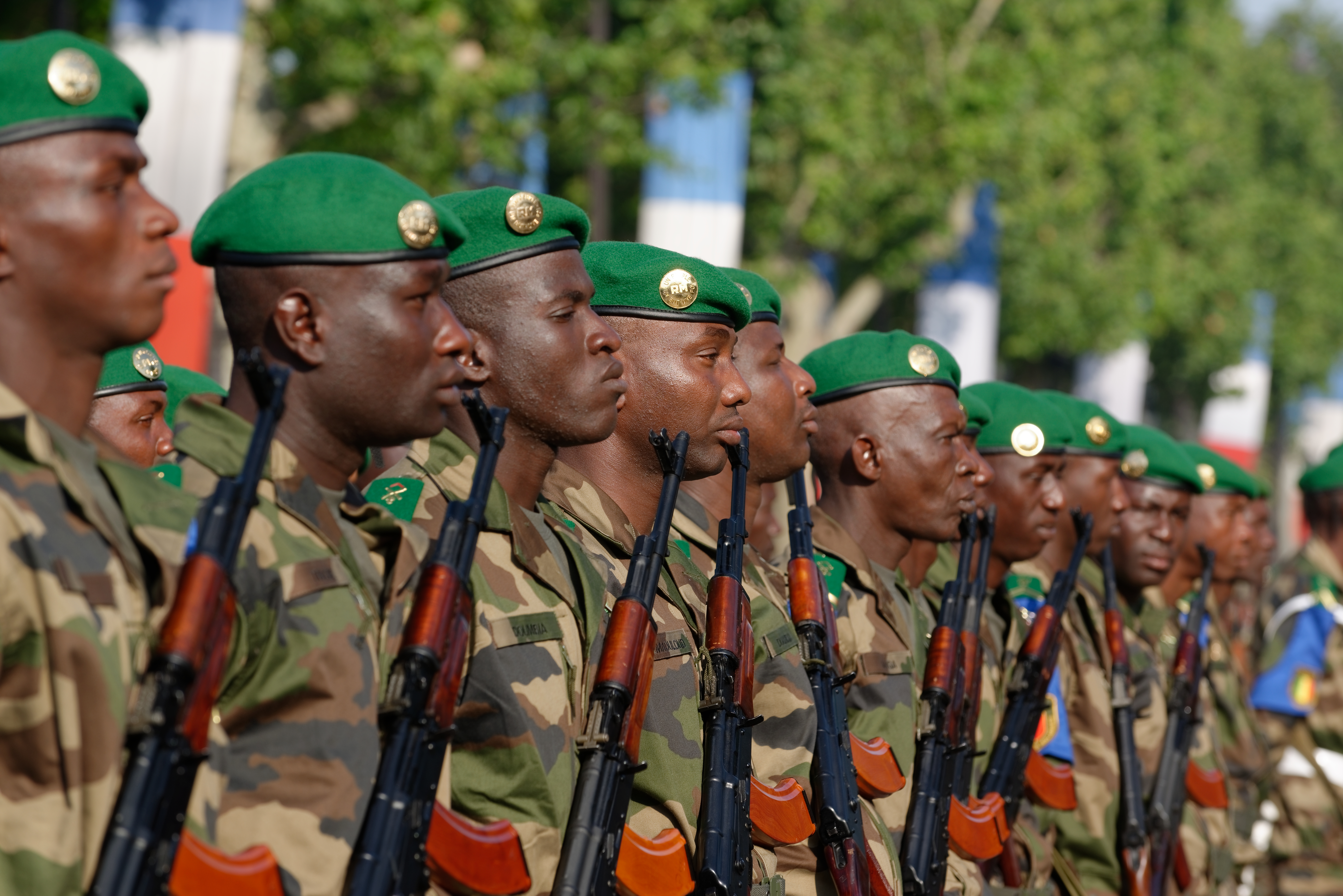
In 2013, Malian troops opened the parade following French involvement in the Malian civil war

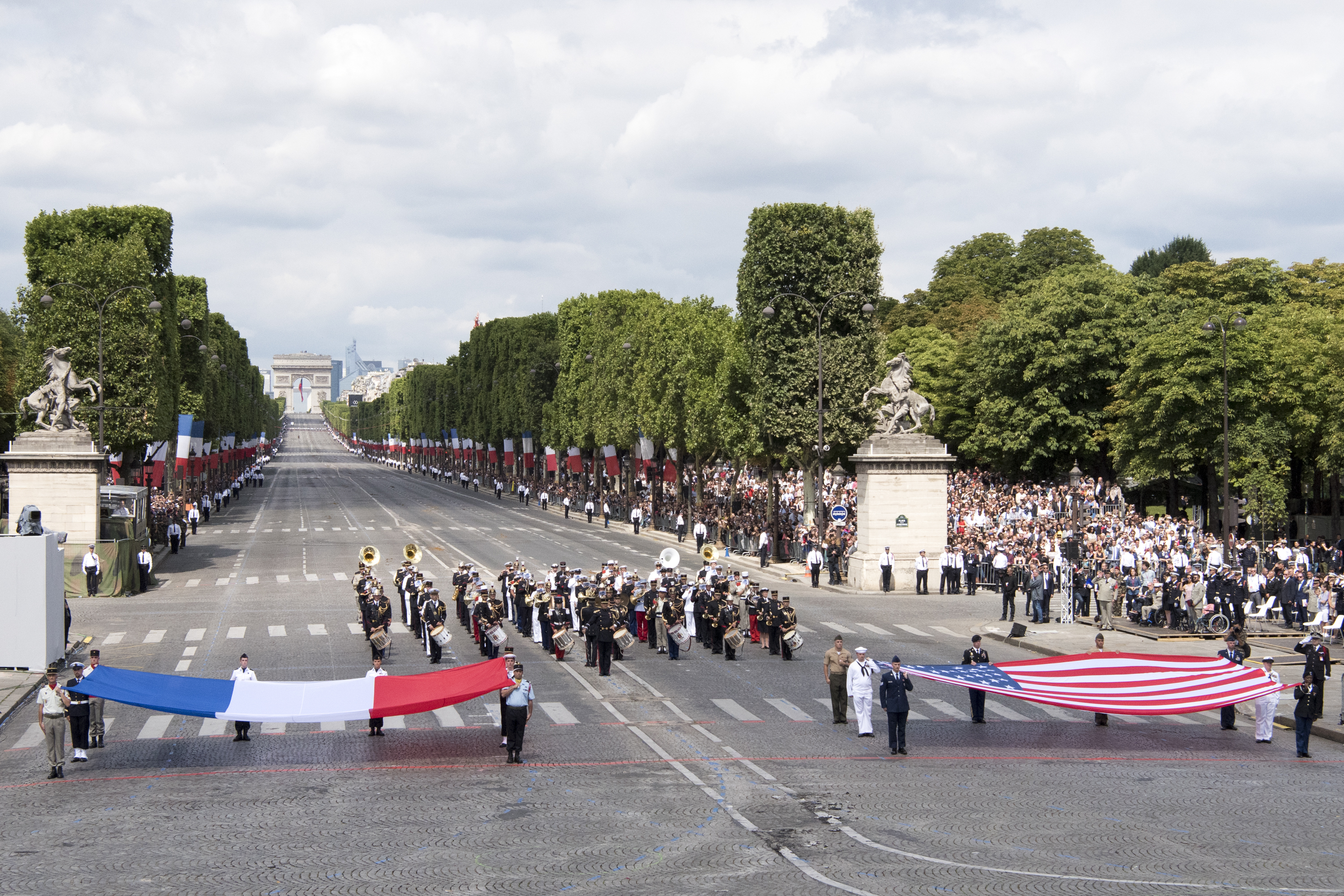
In 2017, US President Donald Trump attended the Bastille Day parade in Paris at the invitation of President Emmanuel Macron
