= Quartier Colonel Dio =

Colonel Dio barracks Quartier Colonel Dio
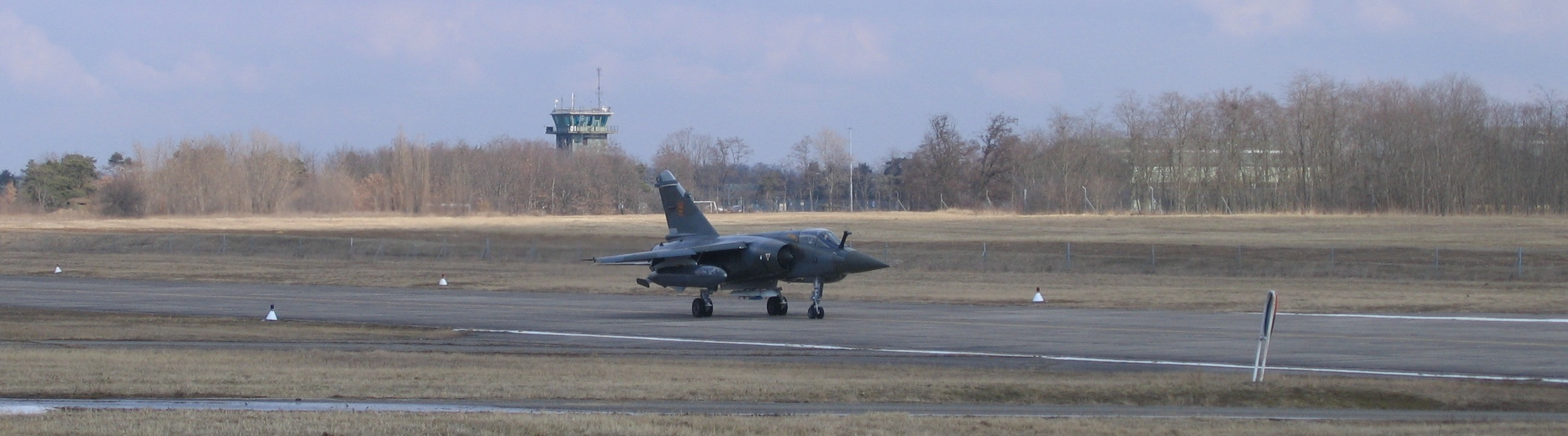
- Mirage F1-CT on base in 2005
- IATA: none; ICAO: LFSC

Summary
- Airport type: Military
- Operator: Chad French Army Regiment (Formerly, French Air Force)
- Location: Meyenheim, France
- Built: 1956
- Elevation AMSL: 693 ft / 211 m
- Coordinates: 47.9225°N 7.3997°E

Map
- Location within France

Runways
Direction	Length		Surface
Direction	m	ft	Surface
01/19	2,430	7,972	concrete

Quartier Colonel Dio is a French Army installation in Meyenheim, in the Alsace region of France, near the German and Swiss borders. From 1963, when it was opened, it was Colmar–Meyenheim Air Base (Base aérienne d'opérations 132 Colmar-Meyenheim) after being an airfield for Strasbourg-Entzheim. The French Air Force used the base until 2010, when it was turned over to the French Army. It is now the home of the Régiment de marche du Tchad (RMT) (free-translation roughly 'Chad provisional regiment'), one of the most famous and decorated units in the French Army. The base is 15 km south of Colmar, east of Autoroute A35. The base is bordered by farmland to the west, and surrounded by forest on its other sides.

== History ==
The construction of Colmar–Meyenheim Air Base began in 1951. The first unit to arrive was the 13th Fighter Wing with F-86 Sabres and T-33 trainer aircraft in 1957. Fighter Wing 013 members lived on the base until the unit disbanded on 23 June 1995. Fighter Wing 030 Alsace and Normandie-Niemen were the two squadrons in operation on the base after the disbandment of the 13th Fighter Wing.

The Fighter Squadron 01/030 Normandie-Niémen was formed six months after Nazi Germany invaded the USSR in June 1941. The unit was created for cooperation between the Free French and the Soviet Union governments. There were initially 12 fighter pilots serving the German-Russian front, but the group was officially declared Groupe de Chasse GC 3 Normandie on 1 September 1942 with Commandant Pouliquen in command. After training on Yakovlev Yak-7s in January 1943, Commandant Jean Tulasne took command of the group. Between 22 March 1943 and 9 May 1945 the unit destroyed 273 enemy aircraft. It received awards from both France and the Soviet Union: the French Légion d'Honneur and the Soviet Order of the Red Banner. Joseph Stalin awarded the name "Niémen" after the Battle of the Neman River in 1944. The group flew to Morocco in March 1947, trading Vulture 11s for the first of the Mirage F1Cs. The EC 02/30 unit departed North Africa on 13 March 1962. In December 1973, the base turned to Air Defense.

Fighter Squadron 02/030 Normandie – Niémen was merged with The Fighter Squadron 01/030 Normandie – Niémen in 2007. The French Government announced in July 2008 that all flying activities at the base would cease one year later. General Jean-Paul Paloméros, the Chief of Air Force Staff, led the ceremony for dissolution of the base. The closure of the base was part of a restructuring of the air force. Six Mirage F1Bs and about twelve F1CTs were planned to relocate to Reims – Champagne Air Base.

The last stage in the base's Air Force history came on 16 June 2010 when the base banner of BAO 132 was furled and transferred to the Service historique de la Défense/Armée de l'air (Defence Historical Service/Air Force) at Vincennes. On 1 July 2010 at midnight, the base became French Army barracks Quartier Colonel Dio.

== Air Force equipment and units ==
Several different aircraft and units were stationed at the base.

Aircraft

- F86 Sabre and T-33 (1957–62)
- Mirage IIIC (1962–65)
- Mirage IIIB (1965–66, 1986–94)
- Mirage IIIE (1965–77)
- F-100 Super Sabre (1966–67)
- Mirage 5F (1972–94)
- Mirage F1CT (1992–2009)
- Mirage F1B (2005–2009)

Units

- 3/11 "Corsica" Fighter Squadron (1966–67)
- 3/13 "Auvergne" Fighter Squadron (1972–1994)
- 13th Fighter Wing (1957 – 23 June 1995)
- 2/13 "Alps" Fighter Squadron (Until 27 June 2008)
- 1/13 "Artois" Fighter Squadron (Until 2009)

== Meteorological station ==
The air base hosted a meteorological station maintained by Météo-France; the station was the sixth-driest in France (after Marignane–Marseille Provence Airport, Perpignan, Clermont-Ferrand, Chartres and Évreux) of the French meteorological service network.

Climate data for Colmar (1991–2020 normals, extremes 1957–present)
Month	Jan	Feb	Mar	Apr	May	Jun	Jul	Aug	Sep	Oct	Nov	Dec	Year
Record high °C (°F)	18.6 (65.5)	22.7 (72.9)	27.3 (81.1)	29.7 (85.5)	34.7 (94.5)	38.6 (101.5)	38.7 (101.7)	40.9 (105.6)	33.8 (92.8)	30.7 (87.3)	24.0 (75.2)	20.3 (68.5)	40.9 (105.6)
Mean daily maximum °C (°F)	5.6 (42.1)	7.6 (45.7)	12.6 (54.7)	17.1 (62.8)	21.0 (69.8)	24.7 (76.5)	26.7 (80.1)	26.5 (79.7)	22.0 (71.6)	16.3 (61.3)	9.8 (49.6)	6.3 (43.3)	16.4 (61.5)
Daily mean °C (°F)	2.4 (36.3)	3.5 (38.3)	7.2 (45.0)	11.1 (52.0)	15.2 (59.4)	18.8 (65.8)	20.6 (69.1)	20.3 (68.5)	16.1 (61.0)	11.5 (52.7)	6.2 (43.2)	3.2 (37.8)	11.3 (52.3)
Mean daily minimum °C (°F)	−0.8 (30.6)	−0.7 (30.7)	1.9 (35.4)	5.1 (41.2)	9.4 (48.9)	12.9 (55.2)	14.4 (57.9)	14.0 (57.2)	10.2 (50.4)	6.7 (44.1)	2.7 (36.9)	0.2 (32.4)	6.3 (43.3)
Record low °C (°F)	−22.0 (−7.6)	−24.8 (−12.6)	−16.0 (3.2)	−7.3 (18.9)	−3.1 (26.4)	2.1 (35.8)	4.0 (39.2)	3.2 (37.8)	−1.0 (30.2)	−7.6 (18.3)	−13.1 (8.4)	−19.0 (−2.2)	−24.8 (−12.6)
Average precipitation mm (inches)	33.1 (1.30)	30.6 (1.20)	34.0 (1.34)	42.8 (1.69)	69.8 (2.75)	66.2 (2.61)	62.8 (2.47)	60.8 (2.39)	51.3 (2.02)	56.8 (2.24)	43.6 (1.72)	43.2 (1.70)	595.0 (23.43)
Average precipitation days (≥ 1.0 mm)	7.1	7.0	7.5	8.5	10.6	9.4	9.2	9.4	7.6	9.3	7.9	8.1	101.6
Average snowy days	7.0	6.2	3.6	1.1	0.0	0.0	0.0	0.0	0.0	0.0	2.7	5.1	25.7
Average relative humidity (%)	87	82	76	74	75	72	69	72	76	83	87	88	78.4
Source 1: Meteociel
Source 2: Infoclimat.fr (humidity and snowy days, 1961–1990)

== See also ==
- List of French Air Force bases
- Colmar, Alsace
