= Escadron de Chasse 3/30 Lorraine =

Fighter Squadron 3/30 Lorraine
- Escadron de chasse 3/30 Lorraine
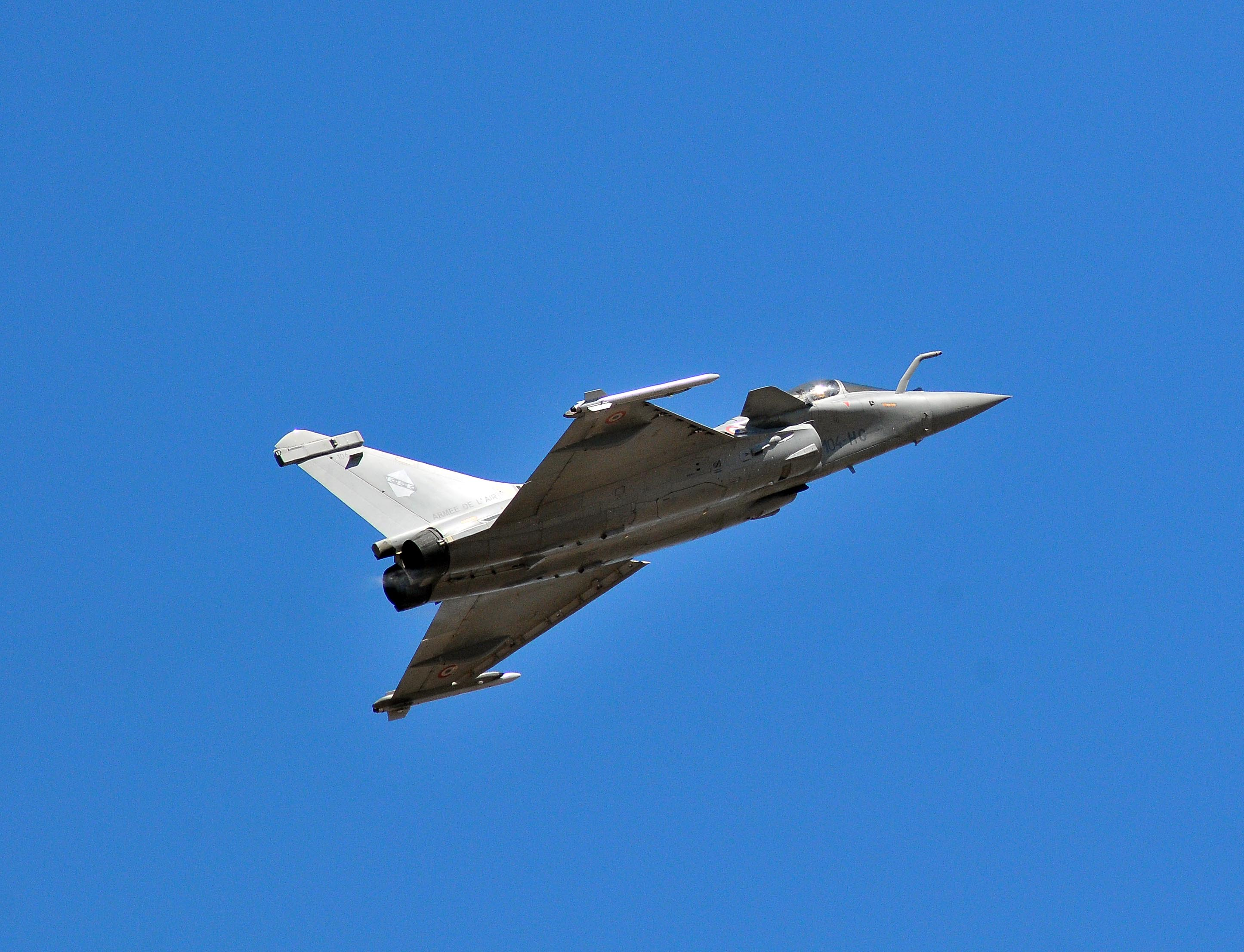
- Rafale
- Active: 1940–present
- Country: France
- Branch: Armée de l'air et de l'espace
- Type: Fighter aircraft
- Part of: 30^{e} Escadare de Chasse
- Garrison/HQ: BA 118 Mont-de-Marsan Air Base
- Engagements: World War II; Second Iraqi Civil War

Aircraft flown
- Fighter: Dassault Rafale C

The Escadron de Chasse 3/30 Lorraine ("fighter Squadron 3/30 Lorraine") is a fighter Squadron of the French Air and Space Force (Armée de l'air et de l'espace) located at BA 118 Mont-de-Marsan Air Base which flies the Dassault Rafale C.

== History ==
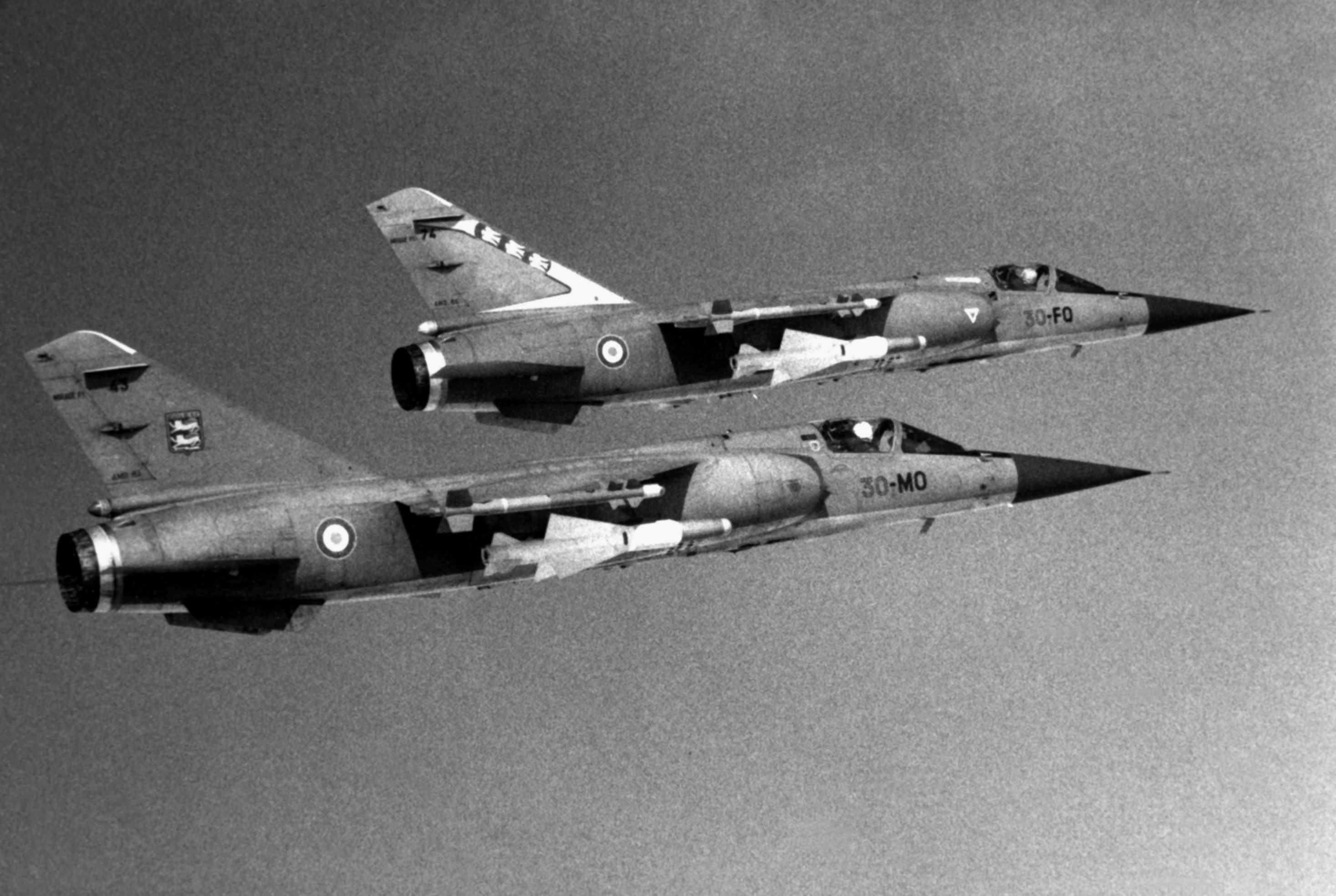
Mirage F1 of the Escadron de Chasse 2/30 Normandie-Niemen and Escadron de Chasse 3/30 Lorraine in 1986 armed with Matra R530.

This Escadron is heir to the Groupe de bombardement Lorraine.

On June 27, 1994, the Escadron de Chasse 3/30 Lorraine was designated again 3/33 "Lorraine".

On June 18, 1996, the Escadron 3/33 Lorraine was awarded the Fourragere at the colors of the Order of Liberation by the President of France Jacques Chirac.

The 3/33 Lorraine, placed in a dormant phase in August 2005, was reactivated under the designation of 3/30 "Lorraine" in October 2010 on Aerial Base 104 Al Dhafra (Djibouti–Ambouli International Airport) in the United Arab Emirates to fly the Rafale and the Mirage 2000-5F, then only the Dassault Rafale from February 2011.

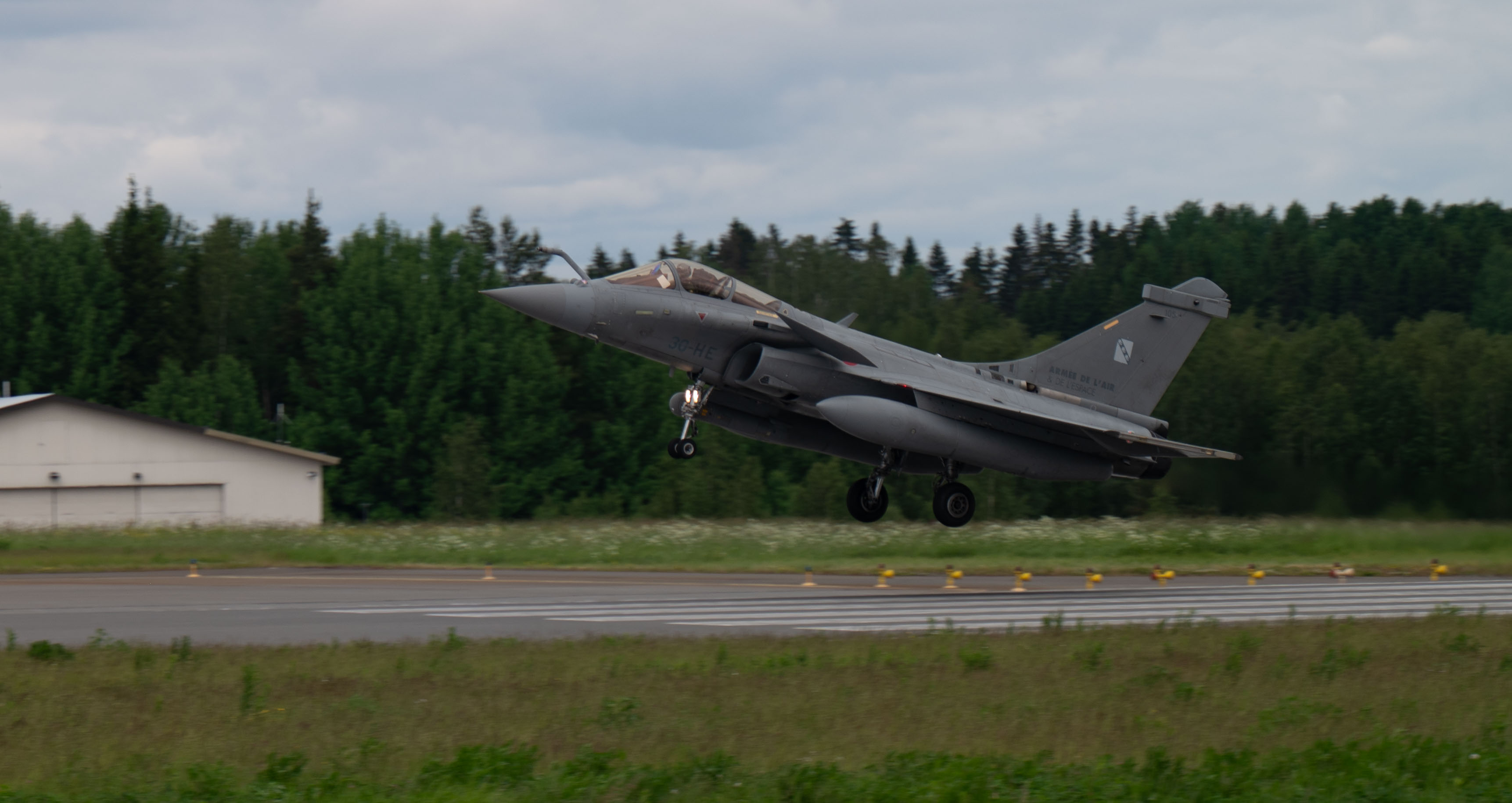
Rafale C from 3/30 Lorraine taking off at Atlantic Trident 2025

On December 15, 2015, a Rafale B dropped a SCALP missile for the first time during Opération Chammal over Iraq.

On June 24, 2016, the 3/30 Lorraine was integrated into the 30^{e} Escadre de Chasse and replaced the 1/7 Provence on Saint-Dizier – Robinson Air Base. Only the traditions were transferred, not the personnel nor the aircraft. Accordingly, the aircraft were progressively repainted with the colors of the 3/30. The Escadron was transferred to BA 118 Mont-de-Marsan Air Base during the course of the following weeks.

== Escadrilles ==
The Escadron is formed of three escadrilles Until dissolution in 2005 :

- 1st Escadrille : Metz (from September 2, 1941, until June 27, 2005)
- 2nd Escadrille : Nancy (from September 2, 1941, until June 27, 2005)
- 3rd Escadrille : SPA 62 'Coq de Combat'(from July 1, 1988 until June 26, 1994, transferred as the 3rd Escadrille of the Escadron de Chasse 1/3 Navarre)
- 3rd Escadrille : Thionville (from September 1994 until June 27, 2005)

Since reactivation in 2010:

- SAL 56 "Scarabée"
- SPA 38 "Chardon de Lorraine"
- SPA 162 "Tigre" in 2016

== Denominations & different designations ==
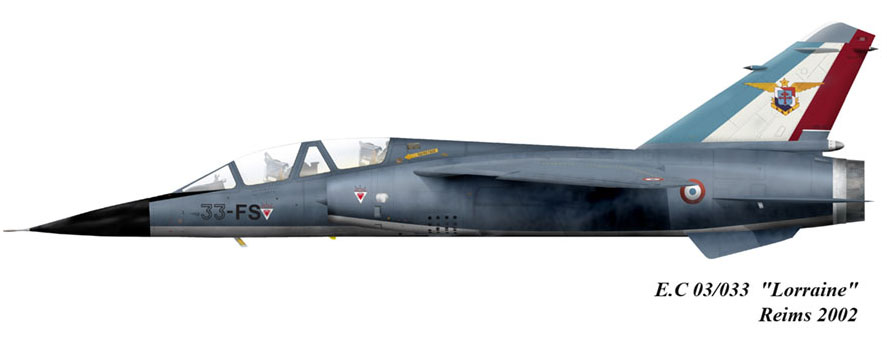
F1B with colors of the 3/33 in 2002.

- Groupe Réservé de Bombardement n°1: December 4, 1940 – September 2, 1941
- Groupe de Bombardement n°1 Lorraine: September 2, 1941 – April 7, 1943
- No. 342 Squadron RAF: April 7, 1943 – December 15, 1944
- Groupe de Bombardement I/20 Lorraine: December 15, 1944 – March 11, 1946
- Groupe de Reconnaissance I/20 Lorraine: March 11, 1946 – July 1, 1947
- Groupe de Reconnaissance I/31 Lorraine: July 1, 1947 – November 1, 1949
- Groupe de Chasse de Nuit 1/31 Lorraine: November 1, 1949 – July 1, 1953
- Escadron de Chasse 3/30 Lorraine: July 1, 1953 – March 1, 1962
- Escadron de Chasse Tout-Temps 3/30 Lorraine: March 1, 1962 – December 20, 1973
- Escadron de Chasse 3/30 Lorraine: December 20, 1973 – June 27, 1994
- Escadron de Chasse 3/33 Lorraine: June 27, 1994 – July 26, 2005
- Escadron de Chasse 3/30 Lorraine: Since October 2010

== Locations ==
From 1961 until 2005, the escadron was successively equipped with Vautour IIN, then Mirage F1, has been deployed on Reims – Champagne Air Base. The latter was reactivated in 2010 on Al Dhafra Air Base, in the United Arab Emirates. In 2016, the Escadron was transferred temporary to Saint-Dizier – Robinson Air Base on June 24, 2016, before joining Mont-de-Marsan Air Base.

- BA 112 Reims – Champagne Air Base (1961 to 2005)
- BA 104 Al Dhafra Air Base (2010 to 2016)
- BA 113 Saint-Dizier – Robinson Air Base (2016)
- BA 118 Mont-de-Marsan Air Base (2016–present)

== Aircraft ==
- Sud Aviation Vautour (1957 to 1974)
- Dassault Mirage F1C (from June 1974 until June 25, 2003)
- Dassault Mirage F1B (from June 1994 until July 26, 2005)
- Dassault Mirage F1CT (from August 2003 until July 26, 2005)
- Dassault Mirage 2000-5F (From October 2010 until February 2011)
- Dassault Rafale C (October 2010 until present day)

== See also ==
- List of French Air and Space Force aircraft squadrons

== Bibliography ==
- Lambermont, Paul (April 1976). "Escadron "Lorraine", du bombardment moyen à l'attaque en vol rasant il aboutit à la chasse tout-tempts" [Escadron "Lorraine": From Medium Bombardment to Low-level Attack, It Ends as an All-weather Fighter]. Le Fana de l'Aviation (in French) (77): 13–18. ISSN 0757-4169.
