= Régiment de Chasse 2/30 Normandie-Niemen =

French air squadron

Fighter Regiment 2/30 Normandie-Niemen
- Regiment de Chasse 2/30 Normandie-Niemen
- Squadron insignia
- Active: 1942–present
- Country: France
- Branch: French Air and Space Force
- Type: Regiment
- Part of: 30e Escadre de Chasse
- Garrison/HQ: BA 118 Mont-de-Marsan Air Base
- Nickname: Neu-Neu
- Engagements: World War II; Indochina War; Algerian War (1954–1962); Battle of Orel; Battle of Smolensk (1943); Battle of Orsha; Battle of Vitebsk; Battle of the Berezina; Battle of the Niemen; Battle of Insterburg; Battle of Königsberg
- Decorations: Legion of Honour; Order of Liberation; Médaille militaire; Croix de Guerre; Order of Lenin; Order of Alexander Nevsky; Order of the Red Banner; Order of the Patriotic War

Commanders
- Notable commanders: Joseph Pouliquen; Jean Tulasne; Pierre Pouyade; Louis Delfino

Aircraft flown
- Fighter: Dassault Rafale C

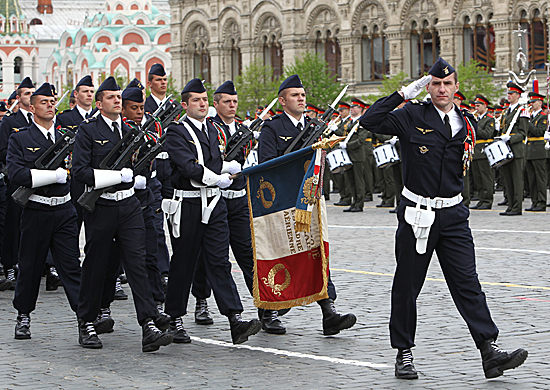
The regiment in Moscow in 2010

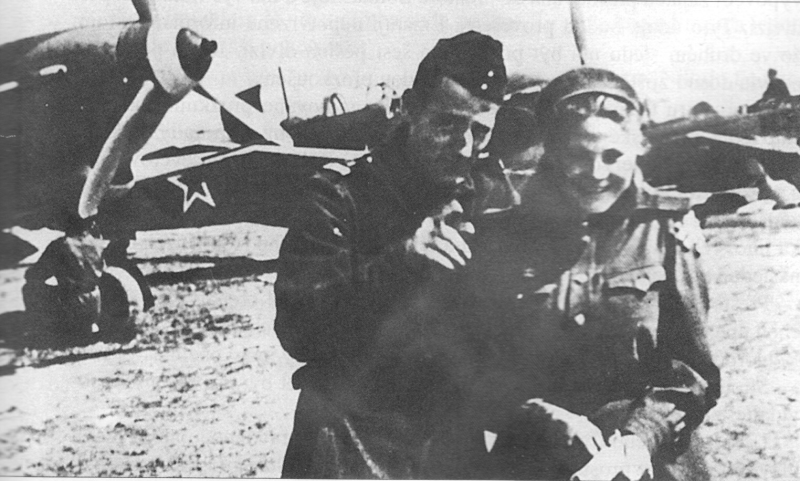
French pilot Bruno de Faletans (later killed in action) and a Soviet radio operator in April 1943

Régiment de Chasse 2/30 Normandie-Niemen (Fighter Regiment 2/30 Normandie-Niemen) is a French Air and Space Force (Armée de l'air et de l'espace) fighter regiment which flies the Dassault Rafale C from BA 118 Mont-de-Marsan Air Base. During a dormant period in 2009, the squadron was equipped with Dassault Mirage F1CT fighters and stationed at the BA 132 Colmar-Meyenheim Air Base.

The Normandie-Niemen Fighter Regiment (French: Régiment de Chasse Normandie-Niémen – (Russian: Нормандия — Неман) has adopted a number of formations and designations since 1942. Originally formed as Groupe de Chasse Normandie 3 in 1942, it was re-designated as a regiment (with and without the "Niemen" designation) in 1944 and received four different squadron numbers (in 1953, 1962, 1993, and 1995) and two later regimental designations (in 2008 and 2011).

The squadron, which served on the Eastern Front of the European theatre of World War II with the 1st Air Army, is notable as one of only three units from Western Allied countries to see combat on the Eastern Front during the war and was the only Western Allied unit which fought with Soviet forces until the end of the war in Europe. (Note: The first was the No. 151 Wing RAF – Nos. 81 and 134 RAF squadrons – which were stationed in Murmansk in September and October 1941. In Operation Orator (September 1942), a RAF-RAAF light bomber wing was stationed briefly at Vaenga.) The 3rd Fighter Group (Groupe de Chasse 3, or GC 3) in the Free French Air Forces was initially a group of French fighter pilots sent to aid Soviet forces on the Eastern Front at the suggestion of Charles de Gaulle, leader of the Free French Forces, who felt it important that French servicemen serve on all fronts of the war. The group, first commanded by Jean Tulasne, fought in three campaigns on behalf of the Soviet Union between 22 March 1943 and 9 May 1945. It destroyed 273 enemy aircraft and received a number of orders, citations and decorations from the Free French and Soviet governments, including the French Légion d'Honneur and the Soviet Order of the Red Banner. Joseph Stalin named the squadron Niemen for its participation in the Battle of the Niemen River.

In 2005, the squadron (now known as Escadron de chasse 1/30 Normandie-Niemen) flew Dassault Mirage F1CT aircraft. It was disbanded in June 2010 and reactivated the following year as a Dassault Rafale unit, with its formal reactivation on 25 June 2012 as Escadron de Chasse 2/30 Normandie-Niemen at the BA 118 Mont-de-Marsan Air Base. The squadron was reattached to the 30e Escadre de Chasse on 3 September 2015, and reformed at the BA 118 Mont-de-Marsan Air Base, it has since been renamed to Régiment de Chasse 2/30 Normandie-Niemen

== History ==
=== Timeline ===
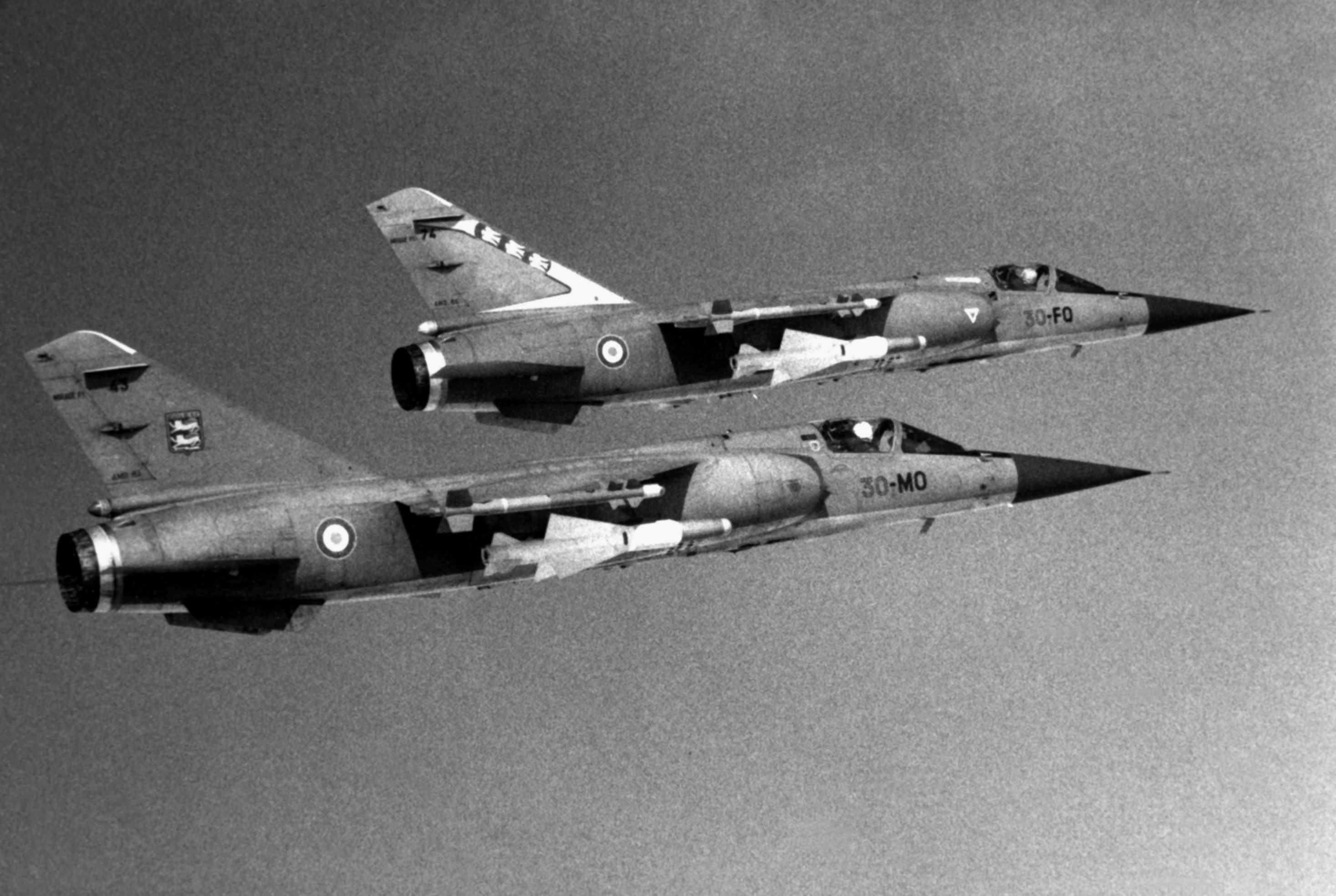
Two Mirage F1s in 1986; the plane nearest the camera belonged to the squadron.

- 1 September 1942: Creation of the Groupe de Chasse Normandie n° III (GC Normandie 3) in Riyaq, Lebanon.
- 7 February 1944: GC Normandie 3 becomes the Régiment de Chasse Normandie (RC Normandie), with four escadrilles.
- 21 July 1944: The Régiment de Chasse Normandie receives the designation Niémen, becoming the Régiment de Chasse Normandie-Niémen (RC Normandie-Niémen).
- 1953: RC Normandie-Niémen is split in two parts, one becoming the Escadron de Chasse 2/6 Normandie-Niémen
- 1962: The 6th Escadre de Chasse is dissolved, attached to the 30e Escadre de Chasse, and renamed Escadron de Chasse 2/30 Normandie-Niémen (EC 2/30).
- 13 October 1993: EC 2/30 is dissolved and renamed Escadron de Chasse 1/13 Normandie-Niémen.
- 1 July 1995: The squadron returns to its name of Escadron de Chasse 2/30 Normandie-Niémen.
- 27 June 2008: Renamed Régiment de Chasse 1/30 Normandie-Niémen.
- 1 September 2011: The squadron becomes Regiment de Chasse 2/30 Normandie-Niémen.

=== Creation ===
When General Charles de Gaulle called on Frenchmen to join him in London in his appeal of 18 June 1940, some went to Great Britain to fight with the Allies. Britain became an important Free French military base and rallying point.

When Operation Barbarossa broke the Molotov–Ribbentrop Pact on 22 June 1941, Soviet authorities declared their representatives of Vichy France persona non grata and asked them to return to France. Colonel Charles Luguet, the air attaché of the Vichy government in Moscow, changed his allegiance to Free French.

De Gaulle, believing in the importance of French soldiers serving on all fronts of the war, decided to engage forces on the Eastern Front in 1942. He initially proposed to send a mechanized division (the future 1st Free French Division, under General Edgard de Larminat) to the Eastern front. British opposition and the advice of Free French Air Forces commander Martial Henri Valin, however, made him opt for an air unit instead of a division.

Soviet diplomats liaising with the French National Committee, primarily Ambassador Alexander Bogomolov, announced that the Soviet government welcomed French aviators on the Eastern Front. On 19 February 1942, de Gaulle designated Luguet and Captain Albert Mirlesse (under the authority of General Valin) to negotiate with the Soviet Union. Negotiations were lengthy, and Colonel Pougachev (military chief of the mission in London) opposed a separate French group near the Red Army. Parallel negotiations in Moscow and Kuybyshev, the alternate Soviet capital, were fruitless.

On 25 February 1942, the first list of pilots was given to the Soviets. The first commandant, Joseph Pouliquen, was tasked by De Gaulle with forming and commanding Fighter Group 3 (GC 3) in Lebanon while awaiting Soviet approval. Fighter Group Normandie was created in late 1942 (the first date mentioned in the Marching Journal was 15 September) as "Normandie". Joseph Pouliquen suggested the name for GC 3; he had wanted to use the name of his province, Brittany, but it was already in use by a bombardment group. The first volunteer group consisted of 14 French fighter pilots and 58 mechanics, joined by 17 Soviet mechanics.

The first 14 fighter pilots of GC 3 came from units of the Royal Air Force or from the Île-de-France fighter group in England and from the Alsace Fighter Group North Africa. The eight British pilots were Aspirants Joseph Risso, Yves Mahé, Marcel Albert, Marcel Lefèvre, Albert Durand, Yves Bizien, Roland de la Poype, and Lieutenant Didier Béguin. The six "Libyans" were Aspirant Noël Castelain, Lieutenants Raymond Derville, André Poznanski and Albert Preziosi, Captain Albert Littolff, and commander Jean Tulasne.

De Gaulle ordered the creation of GC 3 on 1 September 1942, commanded by Pouliquen. Mechanics, pilots and hardware travelled by rail and air via Tehran to Baku.

After lengthy negotiations with Colonel Levandovich, the military chargé d'affaires of international relations at the Soviet Air Ministry general staff headquarters, the group left Riyaq airfield on 12 November 1942 and arrived on 28 November at Ivanovo air base (250 km north-east of Moscow), via Iraq and Iran. The group were trained at Ivanovo in handling their first aircraft: the Yakovlev Yak-1.

=== Second World War ===
The squadron's training on the Yakovlev Yak-7 and Yak-1 lasted from 2 December 1942 to 14 March 1943. On 20 March, French mission military chief in Moscow Ernest Petit, Ivanovo base commander Shumov, commander of the aerial base of Ivanovo, and Colonel Levandovich of the Soviet air force high command reviewed the group for two days. According to the reviewers, "By its military qualities and morals, this unit is ready to be sent to the front"; it became operational on 22 March 1943.

==== First campaign (22 March – 6 November 1943) ====
GC 3, equipped with the Yak-1 fighter, saw combat between Polotnyany Zavod and Monastyrshchina. It became the fourth squadron of the 18th Guards Fighter Aviation Regiment. The squadron was part of the 1st Air Army. Pilots Albert Preziosi and Albert Durand shot down two Fw 190s on 5 April near Roslavl while escorting a Petlyakov Pe-2 bomber. Eight days later, three pilots were shot down; three Fw 190s were also shot down.

The squadron fought in the July Battle of Kursk, in which group commander Jean Tulasne and deputy commander Albert Littolff were killed. Pierre Pouyade, who joined the squadron after deserting from Vichy in Indochina, became commander. It became the focus of Soviet propaganda, and Wilhelm Keitel decreed that any French pilots were to be shot on sight.

In August, the French mechanics commanded by Alex Michel and Louis Duprat were sent to the Middle East and replaced by Soviet mechanics at the order of Captain Sergueï Agavelian. On 11 October, de Gaulle awarded the squadron the Order of Liberation. Only six pilots remained from the original group, which had 72 air victories, by the time GC 3 moved to Tula on 6 November. In their first year at the front, they claimed 86 kills (77 confirmed, 9 "probables") and 16 enemy aircraft damaged against a loss of 25 Yak fighters.

==== Second campaign (1944) ====
The squadron became a regiment in 1944, with a fourth escadrille reinforced by North African pilots. After training on the Yakovlev Yak-9D fighter in Tula, the regiment rejoined the front for its second campaign. The campaign was fought near Dubrovka and Gross-Kalweitchen (in East Prussia) until 27 November 1944. The following day, Joseph Stalin gave the regiment the name Nieman (making it Normandie-Niemen) in recognition of its participation in the battles to take over the Neman River region; it was common to give Soviet units the battle honour names of places at which they had fought. On 16 October, the first day of an unsuccessful offensive against East Prussia, the regiment's pilots claimed 29 enemy aircraft destroyed with no losses; twelve more German aircraft were shot down the following day, again with no losses, for a two-day record. The regiment was based in Germany by November, the first French troops in Germany since the September 1939 Saar Offensive. At the end of the month, Colonel Pierre Pouyade ordered the 303rd Aerial Division emblem (to which Normandie-Niemen belonged) painted on the Yaks. Pouyade was released from command at the end of the year; replaced by commander Louis Delfino, he returned to France with other veteran pilots. By the end of 1944, 201 kills were claimed. The regiment went to Moscow in early winter for de Gaulle's diplomatic visit with Stalin; one-quarter of the pilots were given leave in France, reducing it to three escadrilles.

==== Third campaign (1945) ====
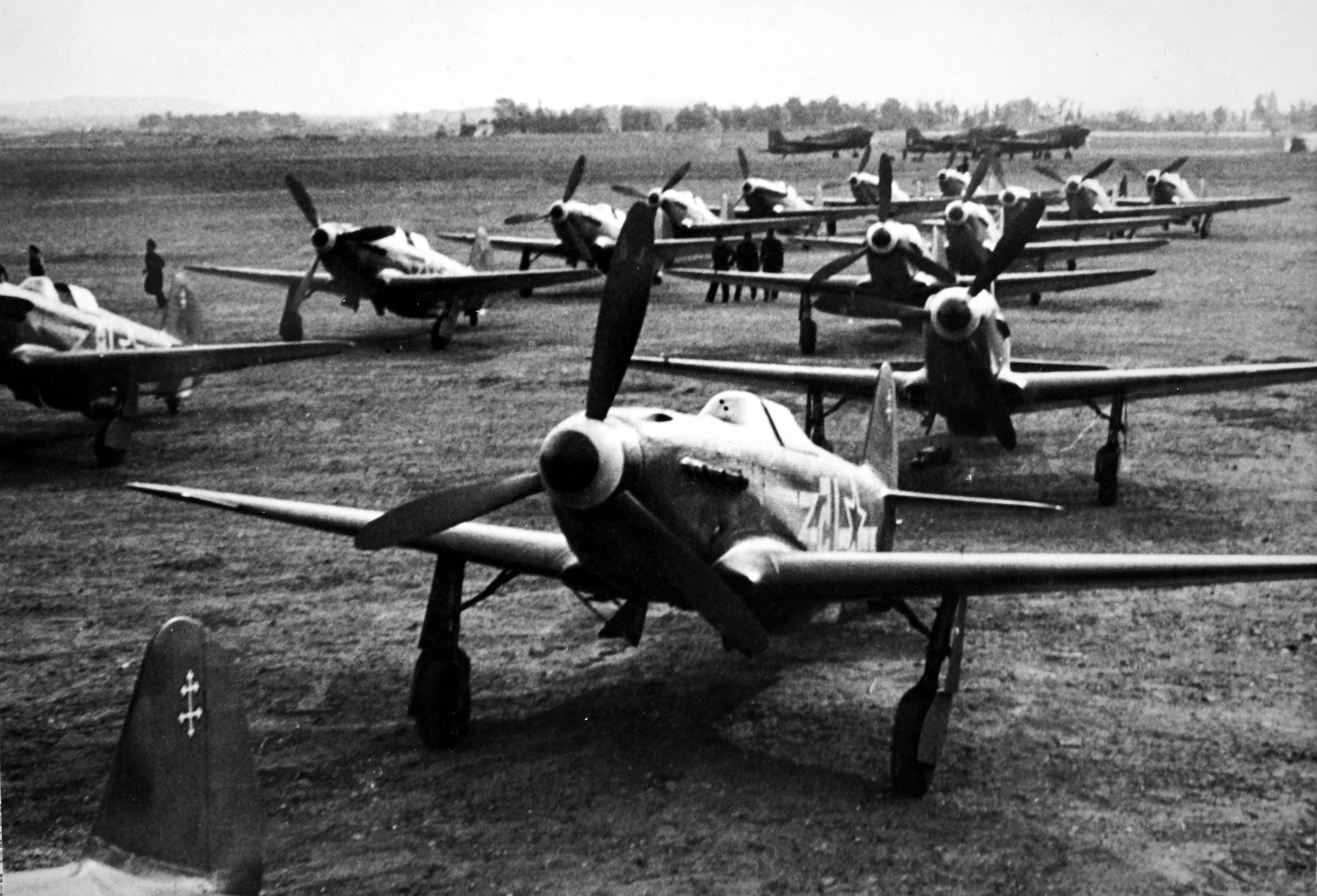
The squadron's Yak-3 fighters in Reims in 1945

The squadron began its third campaign (from Dopenen to Heiligenbeil) on 14 January 1945, concentrating on East Prussia. From January to May 1945 (V-E Day), it participated in the invasion of East Prussia and the siege of Königsberg (now Kaliningrad).

In June 1945, Joseph Stalin decreed that combatants could return home with their arms. The squadron flew to Posen on 15 June, and to Prague the following day. They were received by General de Lattre de Tassigny in Stuttgart on 17 June. On 20 June, the squadron arrived at Saint-Dizier three days later. They were welcomed at Paris–Le Bourget Airport, and their 38 Yak-3s paraded down the Champs-Élysées.

=== WWII statistics ===
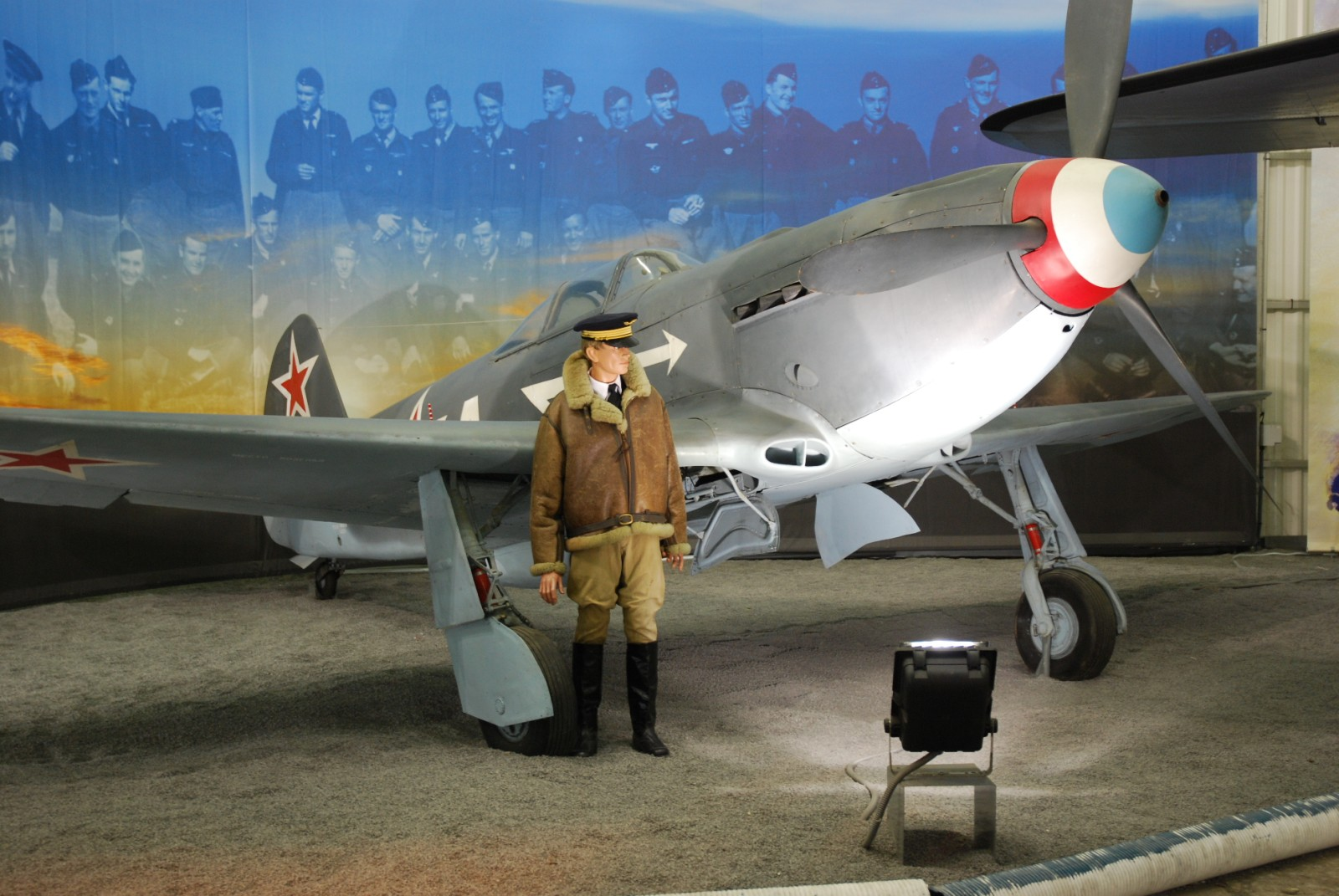
A Yak 3 (01) at Paris–Le Bourget Airport's Musée de l'air et de l'espace; its spinner is the French tricolour.

The squadron claimed 273 enemy aircraft shot down (37 probable), with a loss of 87 aircraft and 52 pilots. About 5,240 sorties were flown, and the unit took part in 869 dogfights. It destroyed 27 trains, 22 locomotives, two E-boats, 132 trucks, and 24 staff cars. Forty-two of the squadron's pilots were killed, and 30 were flying aces. Four pilots (Marcel Albert, Marcel Lefèvre, Jacques André and Roland de la Poype) became Heroes of the Soviet Union. Forty-seven Axis planes were damaged, and eight train stations, five airfields, four garrisons and three factories were attacked.

Its battle honours included Bryansk, Orel, Yelnya and Smolensk (1943); Orsha, Berezina and Niemen (1944), and Insterburg (later renamed Chernyakhovsk), Königsberg (later renamed Kaliningrad) and Pillau (now Baltiysk) in 1945. Members of the squadron received the Légion d'Honneur, the Croix de la Libération, the Médaille militaire and the Croix de Guerre (the latter with six palmes) from France, and the Order of the Red Banner and the Order of Alexander Nevsky (with eleven citations between the two) from the Soviet Union.

==== Aircraft fate ====
The squadron was part of the French Air Force, which ordered the transfer of its aircraft to Toussus-le-Noble in early February 1946; the civilian base had a zone reserved for the air force. As training aircraft, without spare parts, the planes were gradually cannibalized. A restored specimen is at the Paris–Le Bourget Airport's Musée de l'air et de l'espace. Soviet Chief Marshal Alexander Novikov wrote,

The gift of the Regiment Normandie-Niémen of all the aircraft on which they flew demonstrated the sincere friendship between the French and Soviet people ... In giving the pilots of Normandie-Nièmen the honour of keeping their arms and allowing them to return to their homeland on their combat aircraft, the Soviet Union offered them the highest compensation.

=== 1947 and after ===
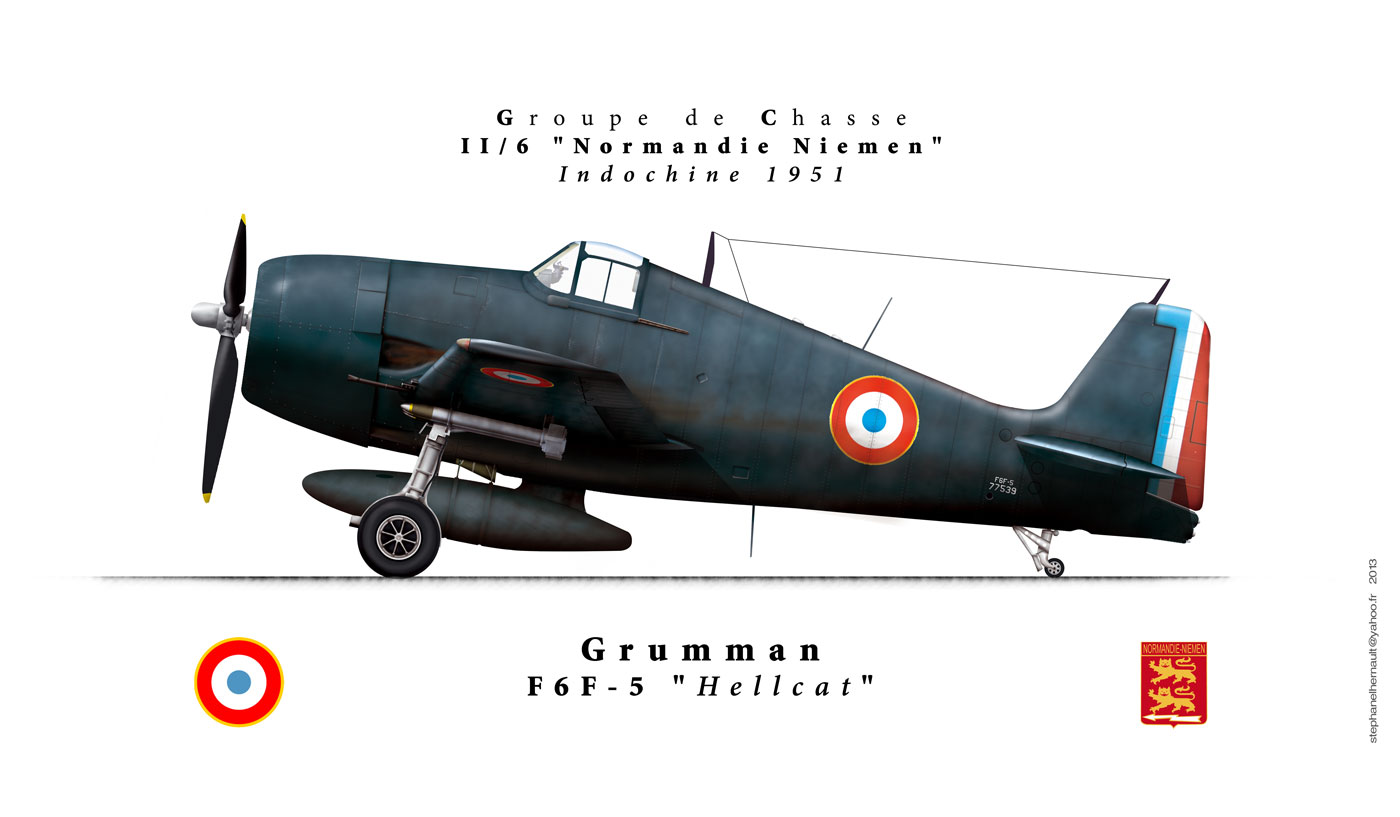
F6F Hellcat, flown by the squadron in Indochina

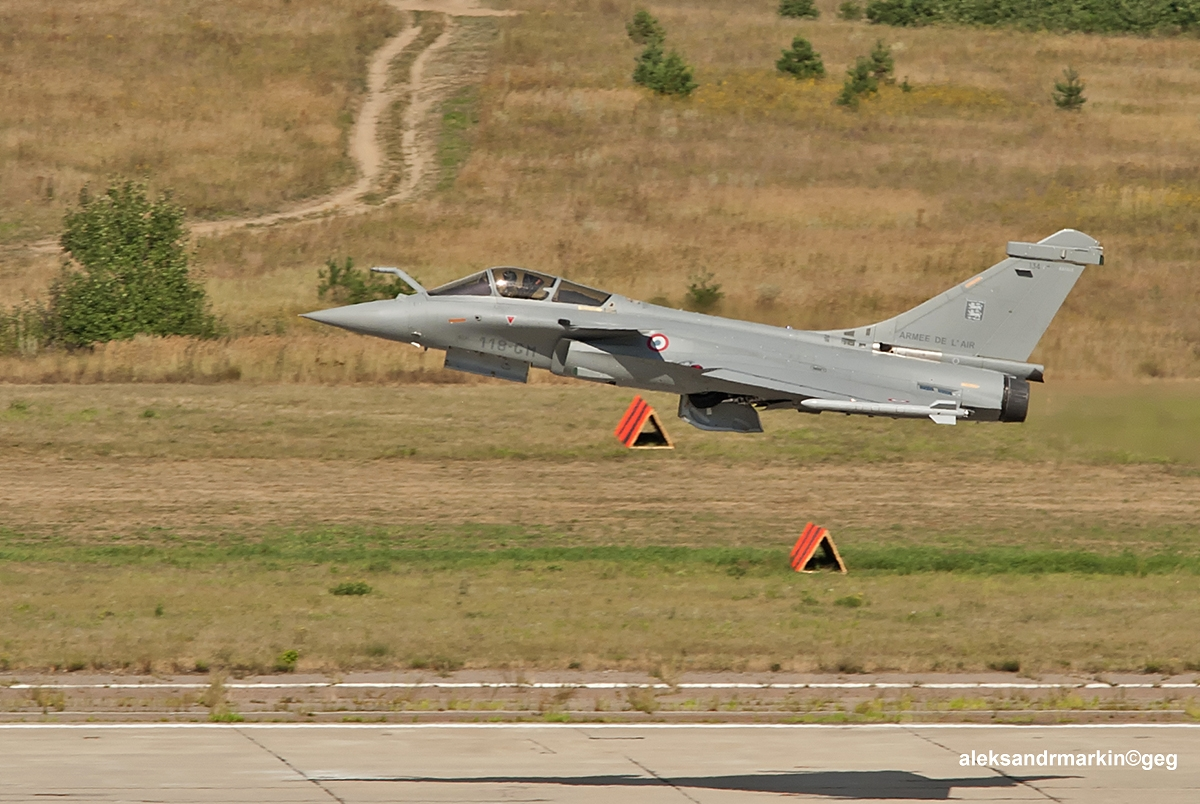
A Dassault Rafale with the squadron's colors

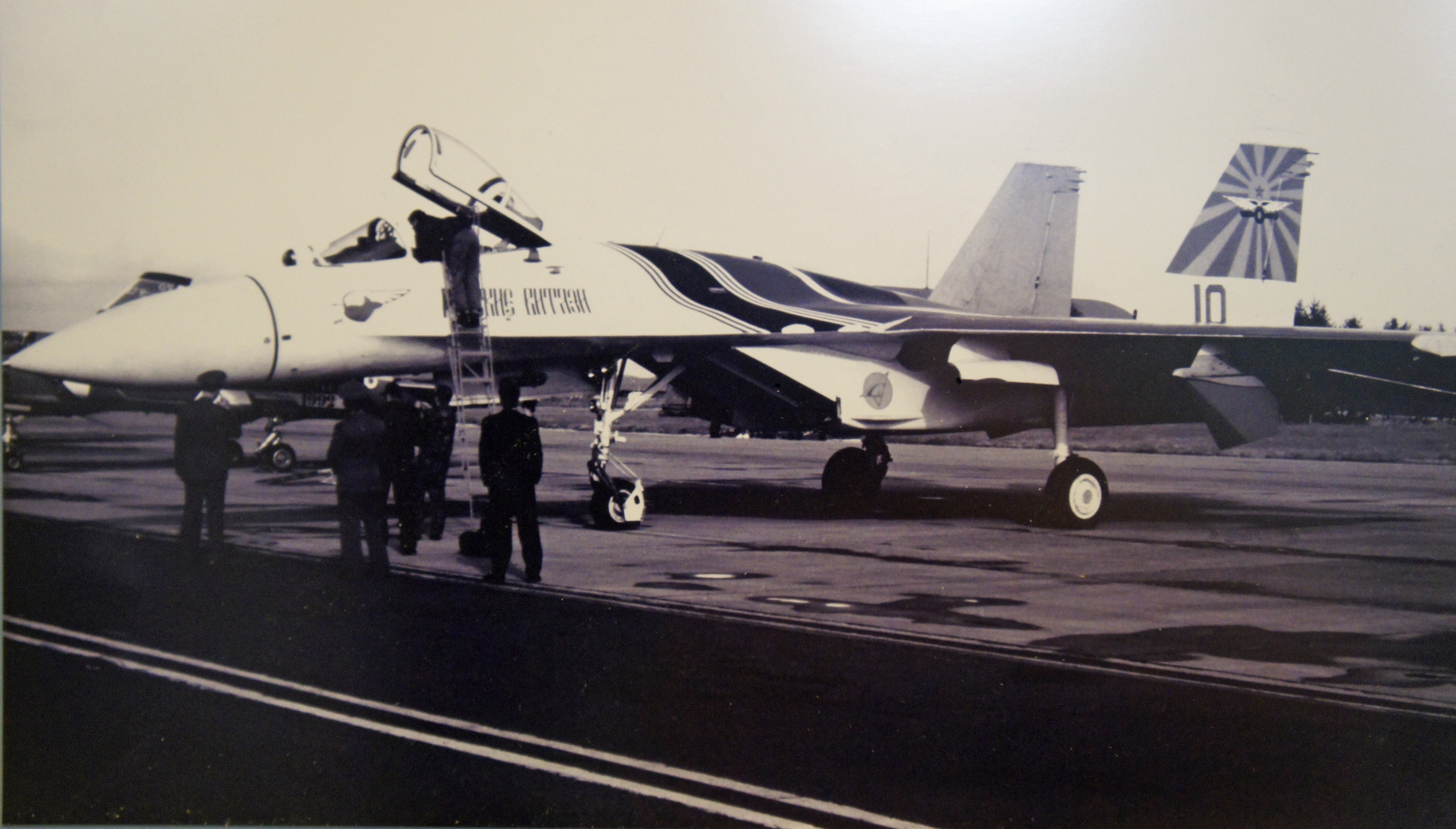
A Russian Knights Su-27 at Air Base 112 (BA112) in 1992

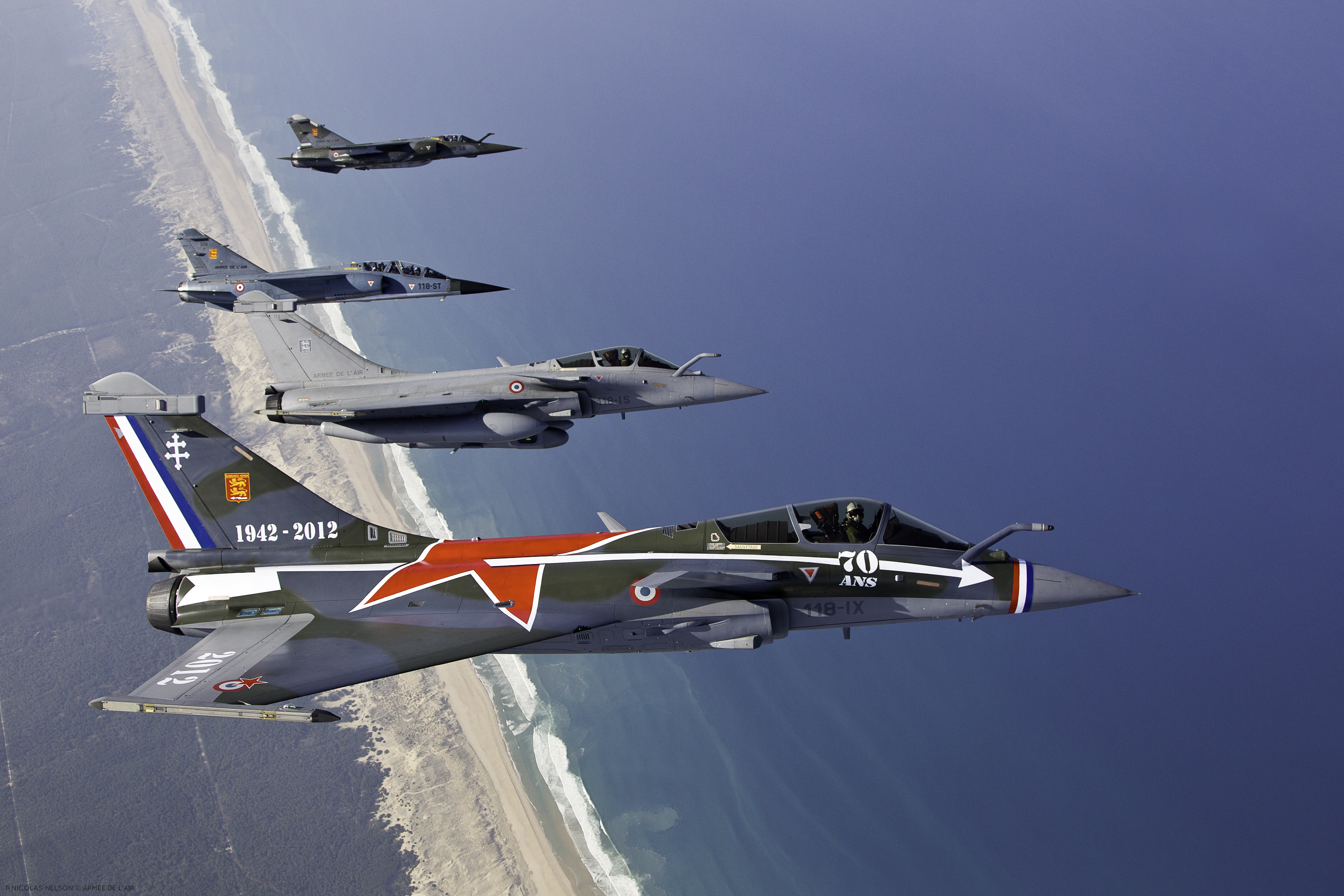
The squadron's 70th-anniversary photo

After postings at Bourget and Toussus-le-Noble, the regiment was assigned to Rabat-Salé Airport in Morocco in 1947. It was stationed in Saigon during the First Indochina War (1949–1951) before returning to Algeria. The regiment was split in two in 1953, and one of the two squadrons became the Escadron de Chasse 2/6 Normandie-Niémen. After the dissolution of the 6e Escadre de Chasse, the squadron was attached to the 30e Escadre de Chasse and became the Escadron de Chasse 2/30 Normandie-Niémen.

It returned to Orange, Vaucluse on 13 March 1962. The squadron moved to Reims – Champagne Air Base (BA 112) in June 1966, remaining there for almost 30 years as part of the 30e Escadre de Chasse. On 18 September 1992, the squadron celebrated its 50th anniversary. The celebration included a visit by Sukhoi Su-27s from the Russian Knights aerobatics team and a delegation of military veterans from the former Soviet Union, organized by French Defense Minister Pierre Joxe and the commander-in-chief of the Russian Air Force.

On 13 October 1993, the squadron was renamed Escadron de Chasse 1/13 Normandie-Niémen. It later left Reims for Colmar–Meyenheim Air Base (Air Base 132) in Meyenheim, near Colmar in Alsace. In 1994, the squadron participated in Opération Turquoise in Rwanda and Opération Crécerelle in Bosnia and Herzegovina. On 9 May 1995, the 50th anniversary of Victory Day, the 18th Guards Assault Aviation Regiment of the Russian Air Force was renamed Normandiya-Neman. Based in Galenki, Primorsky Krai, in the Russian Far East as part of the 11th Air Army, the regiment flies Sukhoi Su-25 ground-attack aircraft.

On 1 July 1995, the squadron was renamed Escadron de Chasse 2/30 "Normandie-Niemen". Four years later, it participated in Operation Allied Force (French: Opération Allied Force). Presidents Nicolas Sarkozy and Vladimir Putin unveiled a monument by Russian sculptor Andrey Kovalchuk commemorating the squadron in Moscow's Lefortovo Park on 10 October 2007.

The squadron was decommissioned on 3 July 2009, with the last takeoffs for Reims and Châteaudun in mid-July; after 17 July 2009, no aircraft flew out of Colmar–Meyenheim Air Base. Its regimental colors and some of its aircraft and pilots went to Mont-de-Marsan Air Base. Veterans of the squadron and a French contingent from the unit participated in the 9 May 2010 Moscow Victory Day Parade in Red Square.

The first Dassault Rafale with the squadron colors took off from Mont-de-Marsan Air Base on 25 August 2011, reviving the SPA 91, SPA 93, Escadrille Spa.97 and Escadrille SPA 97 squadrons.

From 31 August 2015 to 18 September 2015, fifteen Rafales from the squadron's Escadron de Chasse 1/7 Provence and the Escadron de Chasse 1/91 Gascogne were deployed at Corsica's Solenzara Air Base. From 13 to 25 April 2016, two Rafales from the squadron and two from the Escadron de Chasse 1/7 Provence were deployed to an RAF station as part of the Griffin Strike 2016 exercise.

On 9 June 2017, the squadron celebrated its 75th anniversary. With help from the Russian Ministry of Defense, French historian Pierre Malinowski discovered a World War II Yak-1 belonging to the squadron in August 2018.

== Key personnel ==
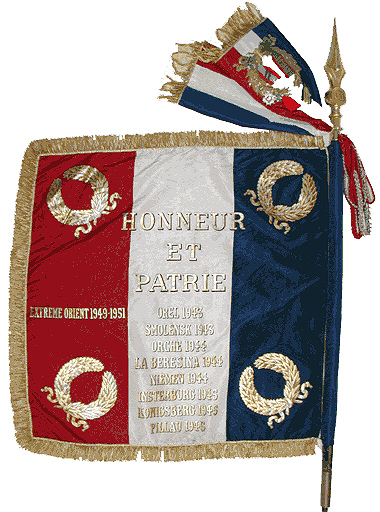
Squadron flag (1943–1951)

- Chiefs :
  - 1 September 1942 – 22 February 1943: Commander Joseph Pouliquen
  - 22 February 1943 – 17 July 1943: Commander Jean Tulasne (killed in action)
  - 17 July 1943 – 12 December 1944: Commander Pierre Pouyade
  - 12 December 1944 – 20 June 1945: Commander Louis Delfino

In February 1945, Delfino reduced the squadron to two units: the 2nd and 3rd, commanded respectively by Captain de Saint-Marceaux and Captain Charles de La Salle. Other notable personnel included:

- Marcel Albert (25 November 1917 – 23 August 2010) – Leader of Unit 1, a Hero of the Soviet Union and Order of Lenin recipient
- Marcel Lefevre (17 March 1918 – 5 June 1944) – Leader of Unit 3, posthumous Hero of the Soviet Union
- Roland de la Poype (28 July 1920 – 23 October 2012) – Member of Unit 1, a Hero of the Soviet Union
- Joseph Risso (23 January 1920 – 24 November 2005) – Member of Unit 1, Order of the Red Banner recipient who flew a Yak-9T
- Jacques André (25 February 1919 – 2 April 1988) – Lieutenant

== Stations ==
=== Second World War ===
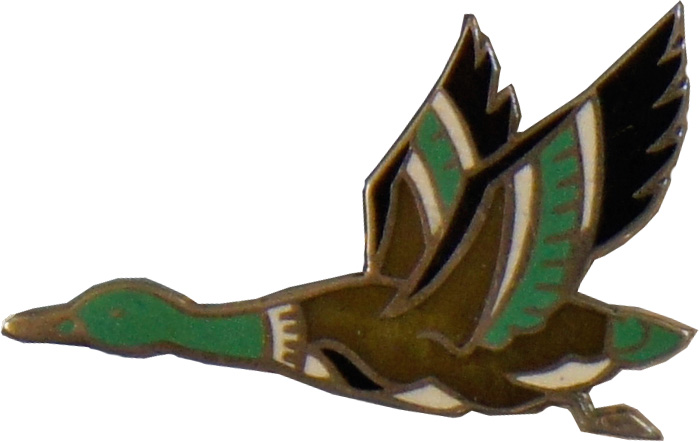
SPA 93 insignia

- 1 September 1942: Riyaq (assembly)
- 28 November 1942: Ivanovo (formation)
- 22 March 1943: Polotnyany-Zavod
- 16 April 1943: Mosalsk
- 20 May 1943: Kozelsk
- 2 June 1943: Khatenki (Note: 10 km north of Kozelsk)
- 18 August 1943: Gorodietchnia
- 24 August 1943: Spass-Demensk
- 2 September 1943: Michkovo
- 15 September 1943: Barsouki
- 18 September 1943: Filatki
- 5 October 1943: Sloboda
- 6 November 1943: Tula
- 25 May 1944: Doubrovka
- 15 July 1944: Mikountani (Note: Mikoutani is a small Lithuanian village half-way between Vilnius and Lida, Belarus.)
- 29 July 1944: Alytus
- 18 September 1944: Antanavas (Note: South-West of Kaunas.)
- 6 October 1944: Sredniki
- 10 October 1944: Antanavas
- 22 October 1944: Didvije-sterki
- 27 November 1944: Gross-Kalweitchen
- 14 January 1945: Dopenen
- 26 January 1945: Gross-Skajsgiren
- 27 January 1945: Labiau
- 5 February 1945: Powunden
- 14 February 1945: Wittenberg (East Prussia)
- 25 February 1945: Friedland
- 7 April 1945: Bladiau
- 13 April 1945: Eylau
- 5 May 1945: Bladiau
- 8 May 1945: Heiligenbeil

=== After the war ===
- March 1947: Rabat-Salé, (Base aérienne 151 Rabat-Salé) (dissolved in 1961).
- 29 October 1949: Saïgon
- May 1951: Oran Aerial Base 141 (Algeria)
- 13 March 1962: Orange-Caritat Air Base
- 1966: Reims – Champagne Air Base (BA 112)
- 13 October 1993: Colmar-Meyenheim Air Base (BA 132)
- 2011: Mont-de-Marsan Air Base (BA 118)

== Aircraft ==
- Yakovlev UT-2 - Basic training aircraft, used for training from 1 to 18 December 1942.
- Polikarpov Po-2 - Used for training from 1 to 18 December 1942, and later for liaison and courier duties.
- Yakovlev Yak-7V - Advanced training aircraft used for training between December 1942 and 25 January 1943.
- Yakovlev Yak-1b - Fighter aircraft used between 19 January and 22 March 1943 for advanced and dogfight training. The squadron originally received six planes; eight were sent in March 1943, and four at the end of April. They began to train new pilots in June, and remained in the squadron until the end of 1943.
- Yakovlev Yak-9D - Fighter aircraft used for training in Tula between early June and late July 1944. Two Yak-9Ds were still used on 10 September 1944.
- Yakovlev Yak-3 - Main fighter aircraft used from late July 1944 to May 1945. Thirty-seven Yak-3s were given to the French Air Force and used from June 1945 to April 1947.
- Yakovlev Yak-6 - Transport aircraft.
- Yak-1
- Yak-9
- Yak-3 - The squadron's last Yak-3 fighter is at the Musée de l'Air at Le Bourget Airport in Paris.
- De Havilland Mosquito
- Dewoitine D.520 - Flown in Lebanon.
- Bell P-63 Kingcobra
- Grumman F6F Hellcat
- Republic P-47 Thunderbolt
- Le Mistral - French-built de Havilland Vampire.
- SO.4050 Vautour
- Dassault Mirage F1 C
- Dassault Mirage F1 CT
- Dassault Rafale C

== Decorations ==
=== France ===
- Légion d'honneur
- Ordre de la Libération (11 October 1943)
- Médaille militaire
- Croix de guerre 1939-1945 with six palms (273 downed aircraft)
- Croix de guerre des théâtres d'opérations extérieures with two palms (1953)

=== Soviet Union ===
- Hero of the Soviet Union
- Order of Lenin
- Order of the Red Banner (19 February 1945)
- Order of Alexandre Nevski (5 June 1945)
- Order of the Patriotic War
- Order of the Red Star
- Medal "For the Victory over Germany in the Great Patriotic War 1941–1945"

== Russian cemetery ==
Monuments and tombs of squadron pilots and unknown French soldiers are in the French Square (French: Carré français) of Moscow's Vvedenskoye Cemetery. The remains of six other squadron members were repatriated to France in 1953.

== In popular culture ==
The 1960 Franco-Russian film Normandie-Niémen, directed by Jean Dréville and Damir Viatich-Berejnykh, explores the arrival in Russia of the first twenty pilots for training and the formation of the squadron. The squadron appears in the Yuri Bondarev 1970–1971 Liberation film series about the Russian war from the Battle of Kursk to the Battle of Berlin, with Italian actor Erno Bertoli playing Pierre Pouyade. The character Lieutenant Duroc (Patrick Chauvel) describes his time with the Free French squadron in Pierre Schoendoerffer's 1992 film, Dien Bien Phu.

== See also ==
- Free French Air Forces
- Mongolian Arat squadron
- Eugene Bullard
- Frédéric Geille
