= 30e Escadre de Chasse =

30^{e} Escadre de Chasse 30th Hunter Escadre
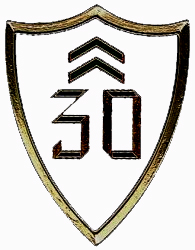
- Insignia of the Escadre
- Active: 3 September 2015 - present
- Country: France
- Branch: French Air and Space Force
- Type: Fighter aircraft
- Size: 4 Squadrons; 1 Center; 1 Inter-arm Team
- Part of: Fighter Brigade
- Equipment: Dassault Mirage 2000; Dassault Rafale

The 30e Escadre de Chasse or 30th Hunter Escadre (French: 30^{e} Escadre de Chasse) is a wing of the Fighter Brigade of the French Air and Space Force. It consists of several flying squadrons and support units.

== History ==
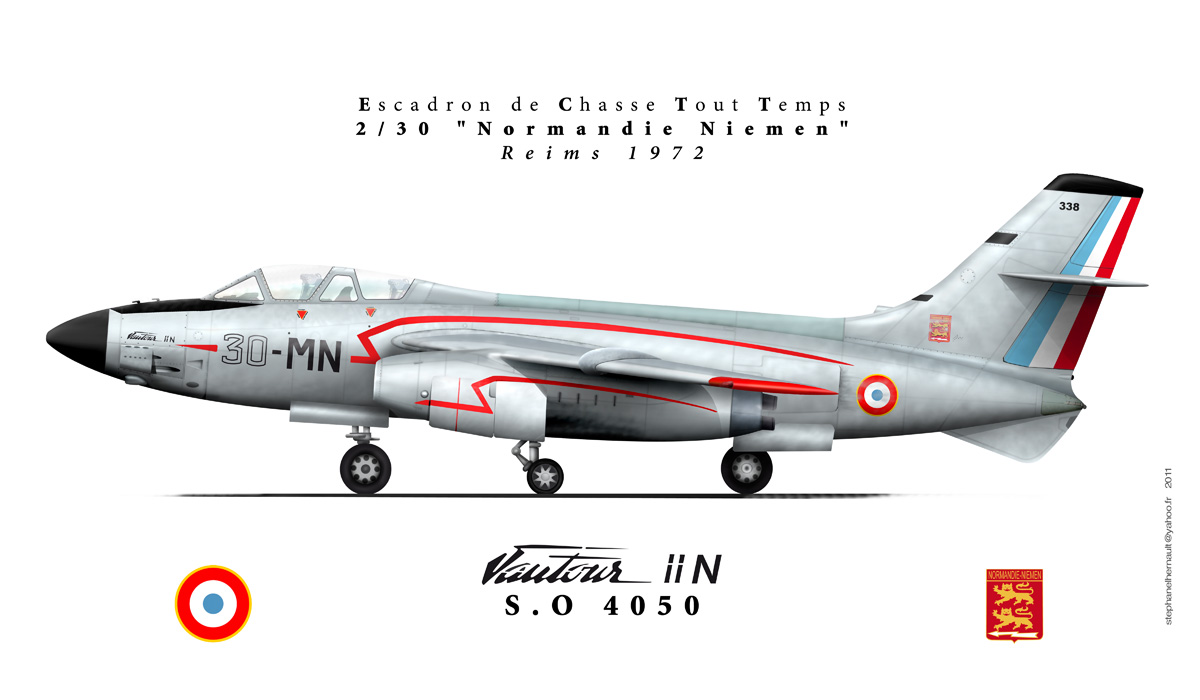
Vautour IIN of the 2/30.

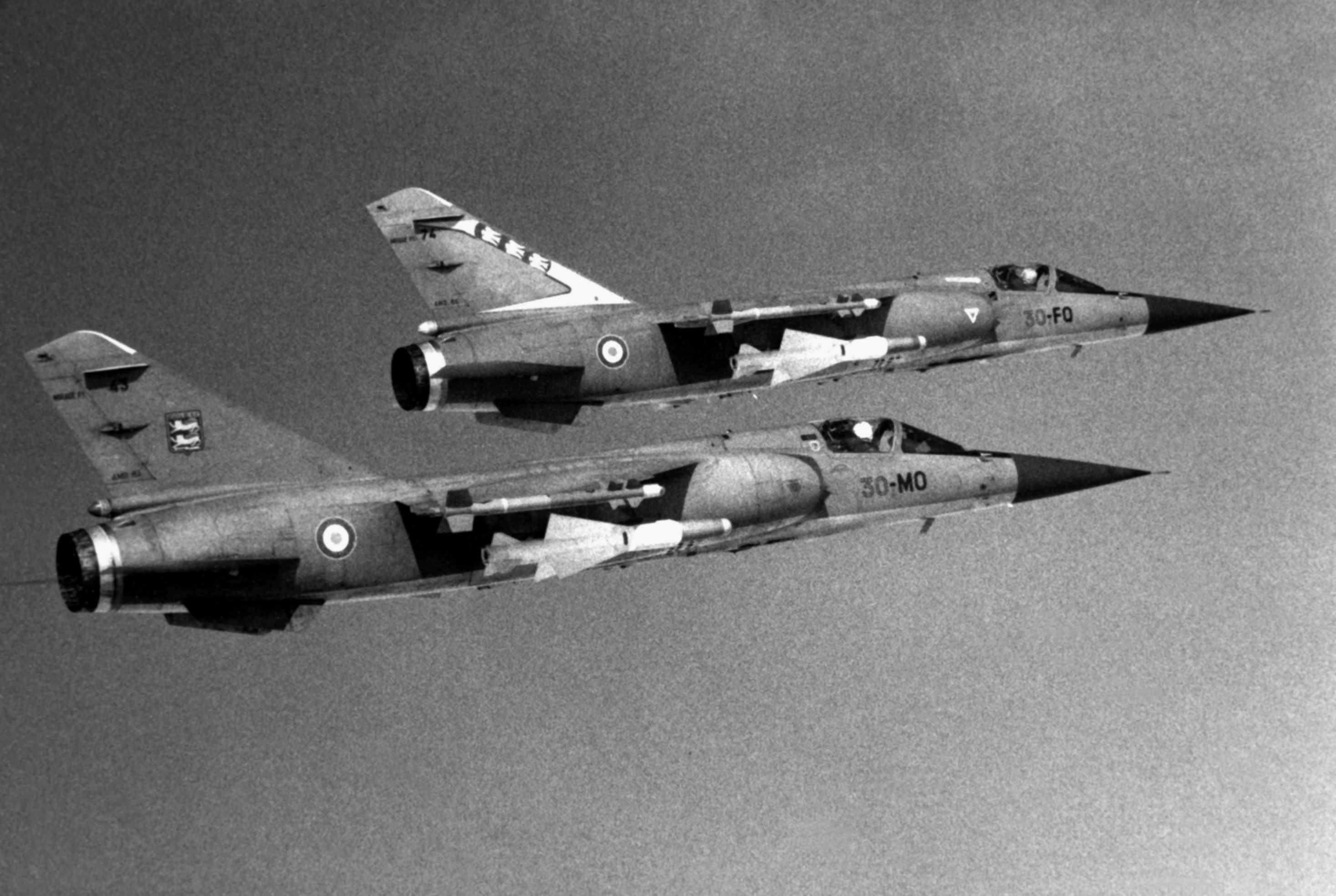
A Mirage F1 of the actual Escadron de Chasse 2/30 Normandie-Niemen (French: Escadron de Chasse 2/30 Normandie-Niemen) and another Mirage of the actual Escadron de Chasse 3/30 Lorraine (French: Escadron de Chasse 3/30 Lorraine) in 1986 armed with Matra R530. Both respective squadron insignias are visible on the aircraft.

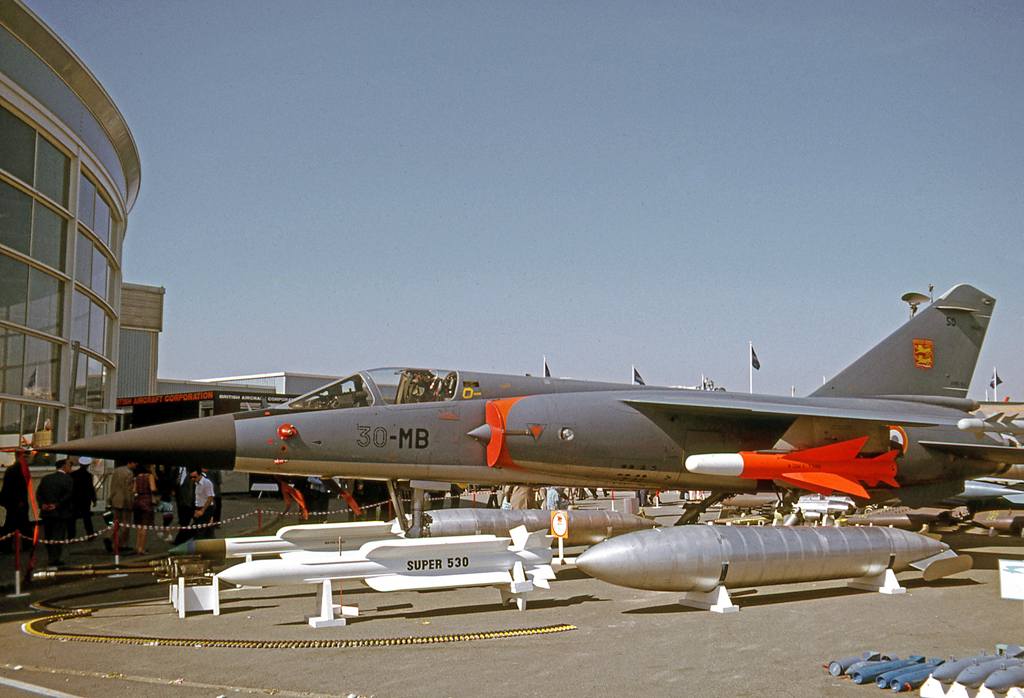
F1C of the 2/30 Normandie-Niemen at the Salon du Bourget in 1975.

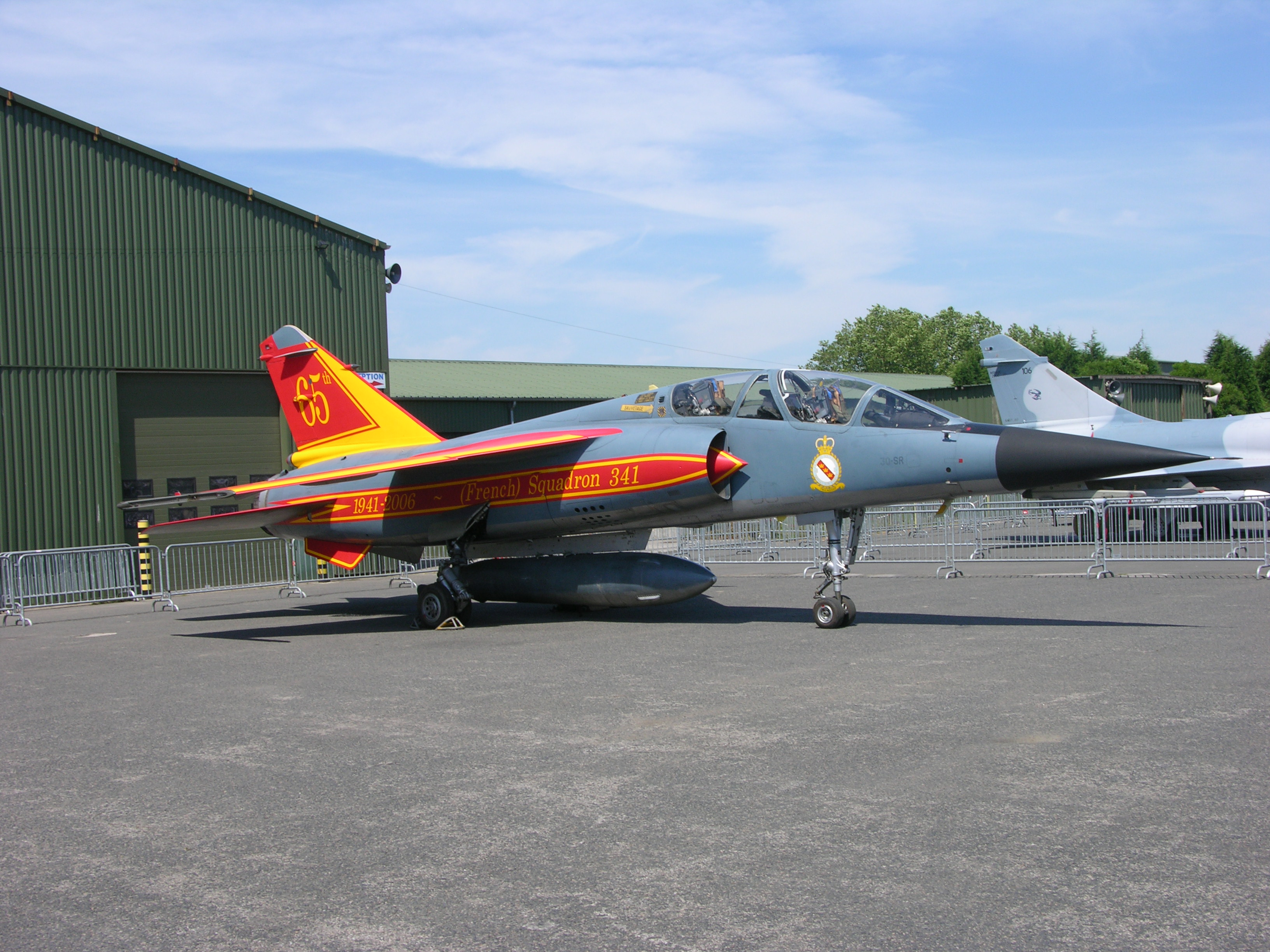
Mirage F1B of the 1/30 Alsace bearing a special decoration for the 65th Anniversary (1941–2006) of the Escadron (Squadron).

=== Tours ===
Representing the traditions of the Night Hunter Fighter Group 1/31- Groupe de Chasse de Nuit 1/31 Lorraine, the 30th Mixed Instruction and Night Hunter Escadre - 30^{e} Escadre Mixte d'Instruction et de Chasse de Nuit was created on 1 May 1953 on the base of Tours. Flying the Gloster Meteor NF.11, the latter comprised three night hunter fighter squadrons : Escadron de Chasse de Nuit (ECN) 1/30 Loire, Escadron de Chasse de Nuit 2/30 Camargue , Escadron de Chasse de Nuit 3/30 Lorraine. The "Camargue" possessed a couple of Meteor T.7 for the transformation of new pilots on the English jet. As of 1957, the Escadre passed to Vautour IIN and became an all-weather fighter wing - the 30^{e} Escadre de Chasse Tout Temps on 1 May 1957. During the same time, the Camargue Squadron was dissolved.

=== At Reims on Vautour ===
With the return from Morocco of the Hunter Fighter Pilot School (French: l'Ecole de Chasse) which left Aerial Base 708 Meknes (French: Meknès) and moved to Tours Air Base, the 30th Escadre moved to Reims, however the latter's squadrons were spread over three bases. Between October 1961 and July 1962, the "1/30 Loire" was attached to the 10^{e} Escadre de Chasse (French: 10^{e} Escadre de Chasse) at Aerial Base 110 Creil (French: Creil). The "3/30 Lorraine" garrisoned at Reims. The 2/6 Normandie-Niemen left the Aerial Base 141 Oran la Sénia (French: Oran la Sénia) for Aerial Base 115 Orange-Caritat (French: Orange), where the later became the 2/30 Normandie-Niemen.

In July 1965 the "1/30 Loire", which had garrisoned at Reims since August 1962, was dissolved.

One year later the "2/30" left Orange to move to Reims.

The two squadrons of the 30^{e} Escadre flew on Vautour IIN until 1973.

=== On Mirage F1C ===
On 20 December 1973 the seven Mirage F1C arrived at Reims to equip the 2/30 Normandie-Niemen. The 30e ECTT became then the 30e Escadre de Chasse (30e EC).

Following the dissolution of the 10^{e} Escadre de Chasse and the closure of the Aerial Base of Creil in June 1985, the Hunter Fighter Squadron - Escadron de Chasse 1/10 Valois recently transformed on Mirage F1C garrisoned at Reims and became the "1/30 Valois".

The 30^{e} EC accordingly possessed three Hunter Fighter Squadrons, each equipped with 15 single-seat Mirage F1C.

On 1 July 1988 the "3/10 Vexin" on the Aerial Base of Djibouti, on Mirage F1C, was attached to the 30^{e} Escadre while assuming the denomination of "4/30 Vexin".

In July 1988 the "3/30" inherited pilots on the Mirage F1 from the transformation mission (until then reserved for the Fighter Hunter Squadron -Escadron de chasse 3/5 Comtat Venaissin (French: Escadron de chasse 3/5 Comtat Venaissin) on Aerial Base 115 Orange-Caritat). The squadron gained the enrichment of the third Escadrille (SPA 62) and Mirage F1B biplaces.

=== The end ===
The 30^{e} Escadre de Chasse was dissolved on the Aerial Base of Reims on 27 June 1994. The "1/30 Valois" was dissolved the same day, while the other three squadrons kept for a couple more years their inherited enumeration of the "30".

=== The recreation ===
The 30^{e} Escadre de Chasse was reformed on the Aerial Base 118 Mont-de-Marsan (French: base de Mont-de-Marsan) on 3 September 2015. The Escadre is equipped with multi-role hunters (French: chasseurs) Dassault Rafale.

== Composition ==
As of 9 September 2015 the 30^{e} Escadre is composed of the following units:

- Escadron de chasse et d'expérimentation 1/30 Côte d'Argent
- Escadron de Chasse 2/30 Normandie-Niemen
- Escadron de Chasse 3/30 Lorraine
- Escadron de soutien technique aéronautique ESTA.15/30 Chalosse
- Centre de formation Rafale 23/30
- Équipe technique interarmées Rafale 61/30

== Historic Squadrons ==
=== Loire ===
- Escadron de Chasse 1/30 Loire (French: Escadron de chasse 1/30 Loire) : from 1 May 1953 until 1 October 1961 and from 1 July 1962 until 1 March 1965.

=== Camargue ===
- Escadron de Chasse 2/30 Camargue : from September 1, 1954, until May 1, 1957

=== Lorraine ===
- Escadron de Chasse 3/30 Lorraine
- Escadron de Chasse Tout Temps 3/30 Lorraine

=== Normandie-Niémen ===
- Escadron de Chasse 2/30 Normandie-Niemen
- Escadron de Chasse Tout Temps 2/30 Normandie-Niémen

=== Valois ===
- Escadron de chasse 1/30 Valois (French: Escadron de chasse 1/30 Valois)

=== Vexin ===
- Escadron de chasse 4/30 Vexin (French: Escadron de chasse 4/30 Vexin)

== Air Bases ==
- Air Base 705 Tours (French: BA705 Tours): from 1 May 1953 to March 1961
- Air Base 112 Reims-Champagne (French: BA112 Reims): from March 1961 to 27 June 1994
- Air Base 118 Djibouti (French: BA188 Djibouti): from 1 August 1988 until 27 June 1994
- Mont-de-Marsan Air Base: from 3 September 2015 – present

== Aircraft ==
- Gloster Meteor NF.11 (1953–1957) and Gloster Meteor T.7 (1953–1957, used by EC 1/30 Loire from 1953 to 1954, and EC 2/30 Camargue from 1954 to 1957)
- MD-315 (1954–1972)
- Vautour IIN and Vautour IIA (1957–1974)
- Mirage F1C (1973–1994)
- Mirage F1B (1988–1994)
- Mirage F1CT (1993–2014)
- Mirage F1CR (2010–2014)
- Dassault Rafale (as of September 2015)
