= List of French Air and Space Force bases =

List of French Air and Space Force bases.

== Active bases ==
=== Metropolitan France ===
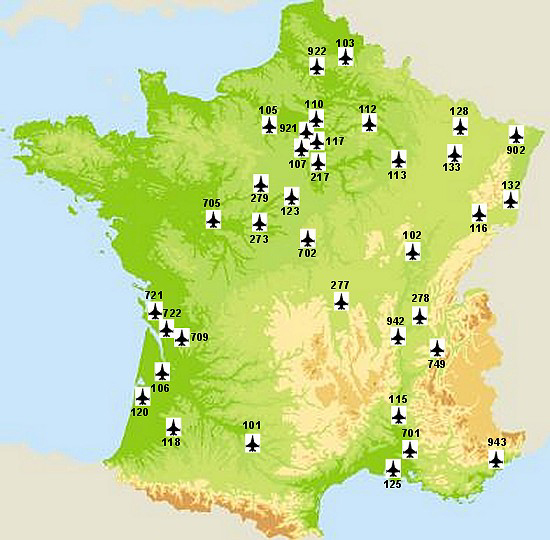
Air bases in Metropolitan France

==== Northern region (RAN: Région Aérienne Nord) ====
Air Base name	Base Aerienne	French title	Notes
Dijon Air Base	BA 102	Base aérienne 102 Dijon – Longvic "Capitaine Georges Guynemer"	closed in 2016
Cambrai - Épinoy Air Base	BA 103	Base aérienne 103 Cambrai – Épinoy "Commandant René Mouchotte"	closed in 2013
Évreux-Fauville Air Base	BA 105	Base aérienne 105 Évreux – Fauville "Commandant Jules Viot"	
Vélizy – Villacoublay Air Base	BA 107	Base aérienne 107 Vélizy – Villacoublay "Sous-lieutenant René Dorme"	
Creil Air Base	BA 110	Base aérienne 110 Creil "Lieutenant-colonel Guy de la Horie"	
Saint-Dizier – Robinson Air Base	BA 113	Base aérienne 113 Saint-Dizier – Robinson "Commandant Antoine de Saint-Exupéry"	
Luxeuil - Saint-Sauveur Air Base	BA 116	Base aérienne 116 Luxeuil – Saint-Sauveur "Lieutenant-colonel Tony Papin"	
Paris Air Base	BA 117	Base aérienne 117 Paris "Capitaine Georges Guynemer"	
Orléans – Bricy Air Base	BA 123	Base aérienne 123 Orléans – Bricy "Commandant Charles Paoli"	
Metz-Frescaty Air Base	BA 128	Base aérienne 128 Metz – Frescaty "Lieutenant-colonel Jean Dagnaux"	closed in August 2012
Nancy – Ochey Air Base	BA 133	Base aérienne 133 Nancy – Ochey "Commandant Henri Jeandet"	
Châteaudun Air Base	BA 279	Base aérienne 279 Châteaudun "Lieutenant Beau"	
Avord Air Base	BA 702	Base aérienne 702 Avord "Capitaine Georges Madon"	
Tours - Saint-Symphorien Air Base	BA 705	Base aérienne 705 Tours – Saint-Symphorien "Commandants Jean et François Tulasne"	
Drachenbronn Air Base	BA 901	Base aérienne 901 Drachenbronn "Capitaine de Laubier"	to become an outstation of Nancy
Taverny Air Base	BA 921	Base aérienne 921 Taverny "Frères Mahé"	
Romorantin - Pruniers Air Detachment	DA 273	Détachement Air 273 Romorantin – Pruniers "Lieutenant-colonel Georges Mailfert"	
Doullens Air Detachment	DA 922	Détachement Air 922 Doullens "Capitaine René Doumer"	

==== Southern region (RAS: Région Aérienne Sud) ====
Air Base name	Base Aerienne	French title	Notes
Toulouse-Francazal Air Base	BA 101	Base aérienne 101 Toulouse – Francazal "Général Lionel de Marmier"	
Bordeaux-Mérignac Air Base	BA 106	Base aérienne 106 Bordeaux – Mérignac "Capitaine Michel Croci"	
Orange-Caritat Air Base	BA 115	Base aérienne 115 Orange – Caritat "Capitaine de Seyne"	
Mont-de-Marsan Air Base	BA 118	Base aérienne 118 Mont-de-Marsan "Colonel Constantin Rozanoff"	
Cazaux Air Base	BA 120	Base aérienne 120 Cazaux "Commandant Marzac"	
Istres – Le Tubé Air Base	BA 125	Base aérienne 125 Istres – Le Tubé "Sous-lieutenant Charles Monier"	
Solenzara Air Base	BA 126	Base aérienne 126 Solenzara "Capitaine Preziosi"	
Ambérieu-en-Bugey Air Base	BA 278	Base aérienne 278 Ambérieu-en-Bugey "Colonel Albert Chambonnet"	
Salon-de-Provence Air Base	BA 701	Base aérienne 701 Salon-de-Provence "Général Pineau"	
Cognac – Châteaubernard Air Base	BA 709	Base aérienne 709 Cognac – Châteaubernard "Commandant Ménard"	
Rochefort - Saint-Agnant Air Base	BA 721	Base aérienne 721 Rochefort – Saint-Agnant "Adjudant Gémot"	
Grenoble - Montbonnot Air Base	BA 749	Base aérienne 749 Grenoble – Montbonnot	
Lyon – Mont Verdun Air Base	BA 942	Base aérienne 942 Lyon – Mont Verdun "Capitaine Jean Robert"	
Nice Air Base	BA 943	Base aérienne 943 Nice "Capitaine Auber"	
fr:Détachement air 204 Bordeaux-Beauséjour	DA 204	Détachement air 204 Bordeaux – Beauséjour	
Varennes-sur-Allier Air Detachment	DA 277	Détachement air 277 Varennes-sur-Allier "Capitaine Rousseau"	
Saintes - Thénac Air Base	EETAA 722	Ecole d'enseignement technique de l'armée de l'air 722 Saintes – Thénac "Capitaine Albert Raffin"	

=== French overseas departments and territories ===
Air Base name	Base Aerienne	French title	Location	Notes
Saint-Denis Air Base	BA 181	Base aérienne 181 Saint-Denis "Lieutenant Roland Garros"	Réunion	
Tahiti - Faa'a Air Base	BA 190	Base aérienne 190 Tahiti – Faʻaʻā "Sergent Julien-Allain"	French Polynesia	
Lamentin Air Base	BA 365	Base aérienne 365 Lamentin	Martinique	
Cayenne - Rochambeau Air Base	BA 367	Base aérienne 367 Cayenne – Rochambeau "Capitaine Massé"	French Guiana	
Nouméa Air Detachment	DA 376	Détachement air 376 Nouméa	New Caledonia	

=== Foreign countries ===
Air Base name	Base Aerienne	French title	Location	Notes
Al Dhafra Air Base	BA 104	Base aérienne 104 Al Dhafra	Abu Dhabi	
Dakar-Ouakam Air Base	BA 160	Base aérienne 160 Dakar – Ouakam	Senegal	
Djibouti Air Base	BA 188	Base aérienne 188 Djibouti "Colonel Massart"	Djibouti	
Eléments air à Libreville			Gabon	

== Inactive bases ==
Air Base name	Base Aerienne	French title	Location	Notes
Reims – Champagne Air Base	BA 112	Base aérienne 112 Reims – Champagne "Commandant Edmond Marin la Meslée"		
Aix - Les Milles Air Base	BA 114	Base aérienne 114 Aix – Les Milles		
Chartres Air Base	BA 122	Base aérienne 122 Chartres		
Strasbourg - Entzheim Air Base	BA 124	Base aérienne 124 Strasbourg – Entzheim		
Bremgarten Air Base	BA 136	Base aérienne 136 Bremgarten	West Germany	See de:Flugplatz Bremgarten
Toul-Rosières Air Base	BA 136	Base aérienne 136 Toul – Rosières		
Batna	BA 143	Base aérienne 143 Batna	French Algeria	
Sétif Ain Arnat	BA 144	Base aérienne 144 Sétif Ain Arnat ou Base Alat 101	French Algeria	Transferred to Algerian Armed Forces control 1962. Now Ain Arnat Airport.
Colomb-Béchar	BA 145	fr:Base aérienne 145 Colomb-Béchar	Colomb-Béchar, French Algeria	Disestablished March 1967. Now Boudghene Ben Ali Lotfi Airport
Berlin Tegel Airport	BA 165	Base aérienne 165 Berlin-Tegel	Germany	
Apt - Saint-Christol Air Base	BA 200	Base aérienne 200 Apt – Saint-Christol		
Bordeaux - Cenon Air Base	BA 203	Base aérienne 203 Bordeaux – Cenon		
Limoges - Romanet Air Base	BA 274	Base aérienne 274 Limoges – Romanet		
Toul - Thouvenot Air Base	BA 551	Base aérienne 551 Toul – Thouvenot		
Compiègne Air Base	BA 552	Base aérienne 552 Compiègne		
Nîmes Air Base	BA 726	Base aérienne 726 Nîmes		
Contrexéville Air Base	BA 902	Base aérienne 902 Contrexéville		
Lahr–Hugsweier Air Base	BA 139	Base Aérienne 139 Lahr–Hugsweier	West Germany	
Eléments français d'assistance opérationnelle à N'Djamena	BA 172	Base aérienne 172 "Fort-Lamy"	Chad	

== See also ==
- List of airports in France
- List of British Army installations
