= Andrey Kovalchuk =

Russian sculptor (born 1959)

- Андрей Николаевич Ковальчук
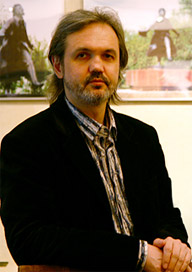
- Andrey Kovalchuk
- Born: September 7, 1959 (age 66); Moscow, Soviet Union
- Education: Moscow Higher School of Industrial Arts
- Known for: Sculpture
- Notable work: To the Victims of Chernobyl (1993); monument to the Normandie-Niémen squadron (2007)
- Awards: People's Artist of the Russian Federation (2003); State Prize of the Russian Federation (2008, 2022); Ordre des Arts et des Lettres (2021)
- Website: studiokovalchuk.ru

Born in Moscow on 7 September 1959, Andrey Nikolayevich Kovalchuk (Russian: Андрей Николаевич Ковальчук) is a Russian sculptor whose career spans more than four decades and whose work includes numerous monuments, memorials, and public sculptures in Russia and abroad. Working in the realist tradition, he is known for sculptures that combine historical narrative with expressive monumentality. Since 2009 he has served as Chairman of the Union of Artists of Russia, and since 2011 he has been a member of the board of the Russian Academy of Arts. In recognition of his contribution to international cultural dialogue, he was appointed a Chevalier of the Order of Arts and Letters by the French Ministry of Culture in 2021.

== Biography ==
Andrey Kovalchuk was born in Moscow in 1959 into the family of architect Nikolai Adamovich Kovalchuk, a long-time collaborator of the renowned sculptor Lev Kerbel, whose major projects included the Karl Marx Monument in Moscow and the Soviet War Memorial in Berlin's Tiergarten. Growing up in this artistic environment, Kovalchuk was introduced to the world of monumental art from an early age.

In 1976 he entered the Moscow Higher School of Industrial Arts, graduating in 1981 after studying architectural and decorative sculpture under Professor Gavriil Schultz.

From the outset of his career, Kovalchuk devoted himself to figurative and monumental sculpture, developing a distinctive artistic language that combines academic realism with a sustained engagement with history, collective memory, and the human condition. Working primarily in bronze, he has created a diverse body of work encompassing public monuments, memorials, portraiture, and chamber-scale sculpture.

A recurring theme throughout Kovalchuk's oeuvre is the commemoration of tragedy and human resilience. His first major public recognition came with To the Victims of Chernobyl (1993), one of the earliest memorials dedicated to the victims of the Chernobyl disaster in Russia. More than two decades later, he returned to the subject with To the Liquidators of the Chernobyl Catastrophe (2017), continuing his exploration of memory, sacrifice, and collective responsibility. Together, these works reflect a broader artistic concern with the ways societies remember loss and transform it into shared historical consciousness.

Another central strand of his work is devoted to military history and national remembrance. Among his most notable monuments are To the Pilots of the Normandie-Niémen Fighter Squadron (2007), commemorating the historic alliance between French and Soviet aviators during the Second World War, and the national monument To the Heroes of the First World War in Moscow (2014), created for the centenary of the conflict. Through these works, Kovalchuk has sought to translate historical experience into a sculptural language that is at once monumental and deeply human, balancing collective memory with individual experience.

Alongside his memorial sculpture, Kovalchuk has developed large-scale projects inspired by humanity's relationship with nature and the distant past. The most ambitious of these is the Archaeopark in Khanty-Mansiysk, realized between 2007 and 2009. Conceived as a sculptural landscape, the ensemble features mammoths, prehistoric horses, bison, cave lions, and early humans, creating one of the largest public sculpture projects of its kind in Russia. The project reflects Kovalchuk's enduring interest in origins, migration, and the continuity of civilizations across Eurasia. In recent years, he has embarked on a new cycle of works inspired by the history and cultural heritage of the wider East, extending his long-standing exploration of cultural memory and historical continuity.

Kovalchuk has received numerous state and professional distinctions, including the title People's Artist of the Russian Federation, the State Prize of the Russian Federation, the Prize of the Government of the Russian Federation, and the State Prize of the Russian Federation named after Marshal G. K. Zhukov. In 2021, he was appointed a Chevalier of the Order of Arts and Letters by the French Ministry of Culture in recognition of his contribution to international cultural dialogue. In 2023, he was appointed an adviser to the National Art Museum of China.

Over the course of more than four decades, Kovalchuk has created dozens of monuments and sculptural ensembles installed throughout Russia and abroad, including works in France, Germany, Finland, Serbia, Kazakhstan, and China. His sculptures are represented in the collections of major museums, among them the Tretyakov Gallery and other Russian and international institutions. Through monuments, memorials, and monumental landscapes, he has established a body of work dedicated to the exploration of memory, history, and humanity's place within the broader continuum of civilization. His sculpture stands at the intersection of remembrance and imagination, linking individual experience with the larger narratives that shape cultures, nations, and historical memory.

== Selected works ==
- Memorial to the victims of the Chernobyl disaster, Moscow, 1993
- Monument to Admiral Fyodor Ushakov, Moscow, 1998
- Monument to Alexander Pushkin, Astana, Kazakhstan, 1999
- Monument to Sergei Rachmaninoff, Moscow (with Oleg Komov), 1999
- Tombstone of Mahmud Esambaev, Moscow, 2001
- "Soldier–Road Workers" monument, 70th km of the Moscow–Minsk highway, 2002
- Monument to Fyodor Tyutchev, Bryansk, 2003
- Monument to Fyodor Tyutchev, Munich, 2003
- Monument to the Gumilyov family (Nikolay Gumilyov, Lev Gumilyov and Anna Akhmatova), Bezhetsk, 2003
- Monument to Saint Savva Storozhevsky and Prince Yury of Zvenigorod, Zvenigorod, 2005
- Monument to Peter the Great, Astrakhan, 2007
- Monument to the pilots of the Normandie-Niémen squadron, Moscow, 2007
- Monument to Grand Prince Michael of Tver, Tver, 2008
- Monument to Alexander Zinoviev, Kostroma, 2009
- Monument to the millennium of Yaroslavl, Yaroslavl, 2010
- "In the Struggle Against Fascism We Were Together" memorial, Poklonnaya Hill, Moscow, 2010
- Monument to Patriarch Alexy II, Yoshkar-Ola, 2010
- Sculptural portrait of the fashion designer Pierre Cardin, Champs-Élysées, Paris, 2011
- Monument to Empress Marie of Hesse and by Rhine, Mariehamn, Finland, 2011
- Monument to Emperor Alexander I of Russia and Crown Prince Charles John of Sweden, Turku, Finland, 2012
- Monument to Rembrandt, Yoshkar-Ola, 2013
- Monument to the people's poet of Bashkortostan Mustai Karim, Ufa, 2013
- Monument to the Heroes of the First World War, Poklonnaya Hill, Moscow, 2014
- Monument to Pitirim Sorokin, Syktyvkar State University, Syktyvkar, 2014
- Monument to Nicholas II, Belgrade, 2014
- Monument to Ivan Bunin, Grasse, France, 2017
- Monument to Alexander III in Livadia, 2017
- Monument to Pavel Fitin, Moscow, 2017
- Monument to Aleksandr Solzhenitsyn, Moscow, 2018
- Monument to the poet Andrei Dementyev, Tver, 2021
- Memorial to those killed in the Kerch Polytechnic College massacre, Kerch, 2021
- "Heroes of ALSIB" memorial, Magadan, 2022
- Monument to the creators of the television film Seventeen Moments of Spring (the writer Yulian Semyonov, director Tatyana Lioznova and actor Vyacheslav Tikhonov), Gorky Film Studio, Moscow, 2025

== Selected exhibitions ==
- Sculpture Biennale, Ravenna, Italy, 1989
- Solo exhibition, Cité Internationale des Arts, Paris, 1992
- Solo exhibition, Finlandia Hall, Helsinki, 1993
- All-Russian exhibition for the 200th anniversary of Alexander Pushkin, Central House of Artists, Moscow, 1999
- All-Russian art exhibition for the 60th anniversary of Victory in the Great Patriotic War, Central House of Artists, Moscow, 2005
- All-Russian art exhibition "Otechestvo", Central House of Artists, Moscow, 2007

== Awards and honours ==
- Honored Artist of the Russian Federation (1995)
- Silver medal of the Russian Academy of Arts (1995)
- Gold medal of the Russian Academy of Arts (2000)
- "Golden Wreath of the Border" prize (2002)
- People's Artist of the Russian Federation (2003)
- Prize of the Government of the Russian Federation in culture and the arts, for 2005
- State Prize of the Russian Federation in literature and the arts, for 2007 (awarded 2008)
- Order of Honour (2010)
- Prize of the SVR of Russia (2013, 2017)
- "Renaissance Française" gold medal (2013)
- Medal "For Services to the Chechen Republic" (2016)
- Order of Friendship (2016)
- Ordre des Arts et des Lettres, rank of Chevalier (France, 2021)
- State Prize of the Russian Federation named after Marshal G. K. Zhukov (2022), for the "Heroes of ALSIB" memorial in Magadan
- Order "For Merit to the Fatherland", 4th class (2023)
- "Legend of Tavrida" prize (2025)

== Public and institutional activities ==
In addition to his artistic practice, Kovalchuk has played a significant role in the cultural life of Russia. Since 2009, he has served as Chairman of the Union of Artists of Russia, the country's largest professional association of visual artists, representing thousands of painters, sculptors, architects, and graphic artists across the Russian Federation. Under his leadership, the organization has expanded its exhibition, educational, and international cultural programs while continuing to support the development of contemporary Russian art and the preservation of artistic traditions. A full member (academician) of the Russian Academy of Arts since 2011, he was elected Vice-President of the Academy in 2025.
