= Louis Delfino =

French flying ace in World War II (1912–1968)

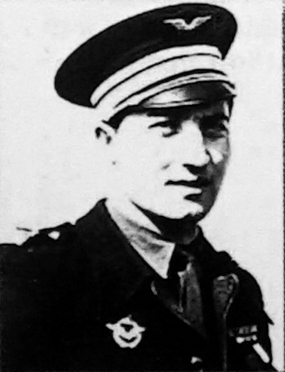
- Delfino in 1945
- Born: 5 October 1912; Nice, France
- Died: 11 June 1968 (aged 55)
- Alma mater: École spéciale militaire de Saint-Cyr
- Military career
- Allegiance: France
- Branch: Free French Air Force
- Rank: General (Air Marshal/Lieutenant-General)
- Units: GC I/4; GC II/9; Normandie Group
- Commands: Normandie-Niemen; 611th Wing; 11th Wing; Defense Zone 901; Aerial Territorial Defense
- Known for: flying ace
- Other work: Inspector of the Fighter Arm; Inspector General of the French Air Force

Louis Delfino (5 October 1912 – 11 June 1968) was a French fighter ace in World War II and a General in the French Air Force. He was a commander of the Normandie-Niemen fighter group and attributed with 16 confirmed victories

== Early life ==
Delfino was born on 5 October 1912 in Nice, France. His father was a cabinetmaker who was killed in World War I and his mother worked in a tobacco factory. He grew up in the neighborhood of Riquier and joined the OGC Nice at 18, notably reaching the semi-finals of the 1930-1931 French Cup.

During the first professional French championship in 1932-1933, he was signed to the CA Paris-Charenton. Later, while training to be a pilot, he continued to play for FC Nancy.

== Wartime Service ==
Delfino entered Saint-Cyr military academy in September 1931, graduated, and was promoted to second lieutenant in 1933. He joined the French Air Force and, after earning his wings on 27 July 1934, began his flying career as a reconnaissance pilot. In 1939, shortly before the outbreak of World War II, he joined Groupe de Chasse I/4 (GC I/4) in Reims. GC I/4 was moved to Wez-Thuisy in August 1939, and Delfino, now a captain and adjutant of the unit, saw little action in the opening months of the war.

On 17 May 1940, he was named commandant of the GC II/9's 4th squadron. After the armistice, he rejoined his old group, GC I/4, in Dakar. In August 1943, he became deputy commandant, but the coastal patrol missions did not satisfy his adventurous temperament, so he applied for transfer to the Normandie-Niemen squadron.

Delfino obtained his transfer to Normandie-Niemen on 28 February 1944. He succeeded Pierre Pouyade as the head of the regiment on 12 November. A major in June 1944, he was promoted to wing commander/lieutenant colonel in April 1945. He finished the war with sixteen confirmed victories and four additional claimed.

On 1 January 1946, he became the leader of the 611th wing, composed of only one group – the Normandie-Niemen. On 11 August, he became commandant of the 11th wing upon its return from Indochina. As a colonel in 1951, he was named inspector of the fighter arm the following year. His tenure at this post had an important influence on the regulation and use of fighters. As commandant of defense zone 901 in 1954, he received his first stars in 1957. He then worked with the aerial territorial defense, of which he took command in May 1961. Promoted to air marshal/lieutenant-general in 1964, he became inspector general of the French Air Force.

He died of a heart attack on 11 June 1968, at age 56 and was buried in the Caucade Cemetery in Nice. He had amassed 4,500 flight hours to his credit.

== List of credited aerial victories ==
Plane shot down	Date	Unit	Plane flown	Location
Heinkel He 111	5 November 1940	GC 1/4	H-75	Halle
Messerschmitt Bf 109	26 May 1940	GC II/9	Bloch 152	Moreuil
Henschel Hs 126	26 May 1940	GC II/9	Bloch 152	Péronne
Heinkel He 111	5 June 1940	GC II/9	Bloch 152	Compiègne
Henschel Hs 126	5 June 1940	GC II/9	Bloch 152	Chaulnes
Henschel Hs 126	6 June 1940	GC II/9	Bloch 152	Soissons
Henschel Hs 126	6 June 1940	GC II/9	Bloch 152	Soissons
Henschel Hs 126	9 June 1940	GC II/9	Bloch 152	Formerie
Wellington	25 September 1940	GC 1/4	H-75	Dakar
Messerschmitt Bf 109	16 October 1944	Normandie	Yak-9	Darkehmen
Focke-Wulf Fw 190	18 October 1944	Normandie	Yak-9	Stalluponen
Messerschmitt Bf 109	22 October 1944	Normandie	Yak-9	Wehlau
Messerschmitt Bf 109	26 October 1944	Normandie	Yak-9	Gumbinnen
Focke-Wulf Fw 190	16 January 1945	Normandie	Yak-3	Kussen
Messerschmitt Bf 109	11 February 1945	Normandie	Yak-3	Rositten
Focke-Wulf Fw 190	27 March 1945	Normandie	Yak-3	Pillau

== Medals and awards ==
- Legion of Honour
- Croix de Guerre 1939–1945
- Order of the Red Banner
- Order of the Patriotic War
- Medal "For the Victory over Germany in the Great Patriotic War 1941–1945"
- Order of Alexander Nevsky

== Bibliography ==
- Persyn, Lionel (May 1999). "Louis Delfino: un Baroudeur sur le Front de l'Est" [Louis Delfino: An Adventurer on the Eastern Front]. Avions: Toute l'Aéronautique et son histoire (in French) (74): 35–40. ISSN 1243-8650.
