= Marcel Albert =

French flying ace

- Born: 25 November 1917; Paris, France
- Died: 23 August 2010 (aged 92); Harlingen, Texas, U.S.
- Military career
- Allegiance: France
- Branch: Free French Air Force; Royal Air Force
- Service years: 1938-1948
- Awards: Hero of the Soviet Union; Legion of Honour

Marcel Albert (25 November 1917 – 23 August 2010) was a French World War II flying ace who flew for the air forces of the Vichy government and Free French Air Forces, he also flew for the Soviet Air Force and the Royal Air Force.

== Background ==
Born on November 25, 1917 in Paris, Marcel Albert grew up in a working-class family. He became a mechanic, building gearboxes for Renault, and was accepted for pilot training in the French Armée de l'Air in May 1938. After primary and advanced training, he was posted at the fighter training center in Chartres, where he flew Bloch 152, Morane-Saulnier MS.406 and Hawk 75 fighters.

== World War II ==
In February 1940 Albert was assigned to Groupe de Chasse I/3, a unit operating France's top fighter, the Dewoitine D.520. When German troops invaded France in May 1940, his squadron was redeployed to the Reims airfield. On 14 May 1940, Albert shot down a Do 17 bomber and later that day, a Messerschmitt Bf 109 fighter, although this victory was not confirmed. He also earned a probable victory over a Heinkel He 111 bomber before the armistice.

Under the Vichy government, his squadron was redeployed to Algeria where Albert flew a few missions against the British forces in Gibraltar. On 14 October he and two other pilots defected and surrendered their airplanes to the British.

Albert later described his Vichy service as deeply uncomfortable, recounting that he and fellow pilots had no enthusiasm for fighting against the Allies and actively sought an opportunity to defect. The defection on 14 October 1940 was planned in advance: Albert and his two companions, pilots Risso and Noel, flew their Dewoitine D.520s across the Strait of Gibraltar and landed at RAF Gibraltar without warning, surrendering themselves and their aircraft. The incident was significant enough that the Vichy authorities subsequently court-martialled all three pilots in absentia.

Having reached England, Albert joined the RAF and flew 47 missions in Spitfires with 340 Squadron.

In late 1942, Albert joined the Normandie fighter group, a Free French fighter unit that was being sent to the Soviet Union to help fight the Germans. The Normandie group entered the fight in April 1943, flying Russian-built Yak-1 fighters, and later Yak-9s and Yak-3s.

Albert quickly proved to be one of Normandie's best pilots. His first kill was over a Focke-Wulf Fw 189 on 16 June 1943. In July he claimed 3 more, and he was given command of the 1st escadrille on 4 September 1943. During the offensive against Eastern Prussia in October 1944, he scored 7 victories.

His score totaled 23 victories (including 15 shared) in 262 combat missions, making him the second highest-scoring French ace of World War II. On 27 November 1944 he was awarded the Soviet Union's highest decoration, the Gold Star and title of "Hero of the Soviet Union" — an award rarely issued to foreigners.

== Postwar ==
After the war Albert flew as a test pilot in 1946 and was later sent to Czechoslovakia as air attaché, where he met his future wife, an employee at the American embassy. In 1948, he left the military and moved to the United States with his wife, and lived in Chipley, Florida, then his last two years in Harlingen, Texas, in the Rio Grande Valley. Albert died there on 23 August 2010.

== Awards ==
- Grand'Croix de la Légion d'Honneur (Journal Officiel de la République française dated 14 April 2010)
- Compagnon de la Libération
- Croix de Guerre 1939–1945 with 15 palms and 3 silver gilt stars
- Médaille de la Résistance with rosette
- Hero of the Soviet Union (27 November 1944)
- Order of Lenin (27 November 1944)
- Order of the Red Banner
- Czechoslovak War Cross
- Order of the Patriotic War 1st class (11 March 1985)

== List of credited aerial victories ==
Aerial Victories
Plane shot down	date	Unit	Plane flown	Location
Do 17	14 May 1940	GC 1/3	D.520	North of Suippes (France)
Fw 189	16 June 1943	Normandie	Yak-1	Brusna-Mekovaïa (USSR)
Bf 110	14 July 1943	Normandie	Yak-9	Jagodnaja (USSR)
Fw 190	17 July 1943	Normandie	Yak-9	Jagodnaja-Krasnikovo (USSR)
Fw 190	17 July 1943	Normandie	Yak-9	Beloto-Orel (USSR)
Ju 88	19 July 1943	Normandie	Yak-9	Krasnikovo (USSR)
Ju 87	31 August 1943	Normandie	Yak-9	Yelnya (USSR)
Fw 190	1 September 1943	Normandie	Yak-9	Yelnya (USSR)
Fw 190	17 September 1943	Normandie	Yak-9	10 km W of Yelnya (USSR)
Fw 190	22 September 1943	Normandie	Yak-9	30 km SE of Smolensk (USSR)
Hs 126	4 October 1943	Normandie	Yak-9	Krasny, Krasninsky District, Smolensk Oblast (USSR)
Fw 190	12 October 1943	Normandie	Yak-9	Horki (USSR)
Ju 88	15 October 1943	Normandie	Yak-9	10 km N of Horki (USSR)
Fw 190	15 October 1943	Normandie	Yak-9	7 km N of Horki (USSR)
Fw 190	15 October 1943	Normandie	Yak-9	7 km N of Horki (USSR)
Ju 87	16 October 1944	Normandie	Yak-3	Pillupönen (East Prussia)
Ju 87	16 October 1944	Normandie	Yak-3	Pillupönen (East Prussia)
Fw 190	16 October 1944	Normandie	Yak-3	SE of Stallupönen (East Prussia)
Hs 129	18 October 1944	Normandie	Yak-3	S of Stallupönen (East Prussia)
Hs 129	18 October 1944	Normandie	Yak-3	S of Stallupönen (East Prussia)
Fw 190	18 October 1944	Normandie	Yak-3	Stallupönen (East Prussia)
Bf 109	23 October 1944	Normandie	Yak-3	8 km S of Stallupönen (East Prussia)
Bf 109	26 October 1944	Normandie	Yak-3	SE of Stallupönen (East Prussia)
