= Pierre Pouyade =

French Air Force general (1911–1979)

- Commandant Pierre Pouyade
- Born: 25 June 1911; Cerisiers, France
- Died: 5 September 1979 (aged 68); Bandol, France
- Military career
- Allegiance: France
- Branch: French Air Force
- Service years: 1930–1956
- Rank: Brigadier General
- Commands: French Air Force
- Conflicts: World War II
- Awards: Grand Cross of the Legion of Honor; Médaille de la Résistance; Ordre de la Libération; Croix de guerre 1939–1945 (France); Médaille de l'Aéronautique; Medal "For the Victory over Germany in the Great Patriotic War 1941–1945"; Order of Alexander Nevsky; Order of the Red Banner; Order of the Black Star; Royal Victorian Order; Order of the Dragon of Annam; Czechoslovak War Cross
- Other work: President Vincent Auriol's air attaché (1947-1950); Military attaché for the French Embassy in Argentina (1950-1953); Consultant fot several French arms companies Deputy for Corrèze and Var in the French National Assembly (1967-1973)

Pierre Pouyade (25 June 1911 – 5 September 1979) was a French Air Force general, World War II flying ace, and a commander of the Normandie-Niemen squadron. By the end of the War he had scored eight solo victories and two group victories, all but one on the Eastern Front.

== Biography ==
=== Early life ===
Pouyade was born into a military family and studied in the Prytanée National Militaire from 1924 to 1928. In 1930 he entered Saint Cyr but after two years decided to pursue a career in the Air Force. He was commissioned as a pilot in the Versailles Air Academy in 1934. Lieutenant Pouyade served in the 6th Fighter Wing at Chartres Airfield from 1935 to 1937 and was then transferred to the Reims-based 13th Fighter Wing. On 15 June 1939 he was promoted to captain.

=== World War II ===
During the Battle of France he served as commander of GCN II./13, a Potez 630 night fighter squadron. On 2 June 1940, after destroying an enemy He 111, he was shot down and wounded. He remained in the Vichy French Air Force.

On 23 November 1940 he was posted to French Indochina as a fighter squadron commander with EC II./295, flying the MS.406. The colony, nominally administered by the Governor General Jean Decoux, was practically under Japanese rule in the aftermath of the 1940 Franco-Thai War. Pouyade was ordered to engage any Chinese Air Force or 'Flying Tigers' planes encountered.

On 2 October 1942 Pouyade deserted, stealing the Japanese air defense plans for the region. He took off from Bach Mai Airfield in a Potez 25 and flew to China, crash-landing near Kunming. There he made contact with the Free French delegation in Chongqing, which arranged for him to travel to London. The Vichy Government sentenced him to death in absentia for his desertion.

=== Free French Air Force ===
After a five-month-long journey through India, Africa and the United States he reached Britain in February 1943. The commander of the Free French Air Force, General Martial Valin, introduced him to Charles De Gaulle, who assigned him to recruit volunteers for the Normandie squadron, a Soviet-based Free French Air Force unit which took part in the combat operations on the Eastern Front.

Pouyade was sent in May 1943 to the Soviet Union to participate in the fighting as chief of an escadrille in the unit, arriving in June 1943. On 14 July, he claimed a Bf 110, and a Fw 189 and a Ju 87 the next day. On 18 July the Normandie-Niemen commander Jean Tulasne was shot down in a battle over Oryol and killed, and Pouyade replaced him. Under his leadership the unit took part in the battles for Belarus. On 21 July 1944, after its participation in Operation Bagration the unit was renamed Normandie-Niemen, for its contribution to the campaign in the eponymous river's area. They were later involved in the fighting over Poland and East Prussia, as part of General Georgi Zakharov's 303rd Air Army.

On 11 November 1944 Pouyade was relieved from his duty as commander and replaced by Louis Delfino. He returned to the now-liberated France, where he was severely injured in a car accident in January 1945. After recovering, he returned to active duty at April. When the war ended he held the rank of lieutenant colonel and had scored eight solo and two group kills in 178 sorties.

=== Post-war life ===
In 1947 Pouyade became president Vincent Auriol's air attaché, a post which he held for three years. From 1950 to 1953 he was the military attaché in the French Embassy in Argentina. Afterwards he served as an instructor in the NATO Defense College. In 1956 Brigadier General Pouyade retired from the French Armed Forces.

After his discharge he worked as an advisor on Soviet matters in the French arms company CSIAé (Sindicate of Aerospace Industries) and as the director of the overseas department in RICOM. On 9 February 1966 he replaced Jean Charbonnel as the Union for the New Republic's deputy for Corrèze in the French National Assembly. From March 1967 until April 1973 he held the same post for Var. Pouyade chaired the Franco-Soviet Friendship Association and was awarded the Lenin Peace Prize by the Soviet government during 1976. He died from cancer in 1979 and his ashes were scattered off the coast of Toulon.
