= Monastyrshchina =

Monastyrshchina (Russian: Монастырщина) is the name of several inhabited localities in Russia.

Urban localities

- Monastyrshchina, Monastyrshchinsky District, Smolensk Oblast, a settlement under the administrative jurisdiction of Monastyrshchinskoye Urban Settlement in Monastyrshchinsky District of Smolensk Oblast

Rural localities

- Monastyrshchina, Orichevsky District, Kirov Oblast, a selo in Pustoshinsky Rural Okrug of Orichevsky District of Kirov Oblast
- Monastyrshchina, Orlovsky District, Kirov Oblast, a village in Podgorodny Rural Okrug of Orlovsky District of Kirov Oblast
- Monastyrshchina, Safonovsky District, Smolensk Oblast, a village in Prudkovskoye Rural Settlement of Safonovsky District of Smolensk Oblast
- Monastyrshchina, Voronezh Oblast, a selo in Monastyrshchinskoye Rural Settlement of Bogucharsky District of Voronezh Oblast
