= Escadron de chasse et d'expérimentation 1/30 Côte d'Argent =

Fighter and Experimentation Squadron 1/30 Côte d'Argent
- Escadron de chasse et d'expérimentation 1/30 Côte d'Argent
- Country: France
- Branch: Armée de l'air et de l'espace
- Type: Fighter aircraft
- Role: Aircraft Experimentation
- Garrison/HQ: BA 118 Mont-de-Marsan Air Base

Aircraft flown
- Trainer: Dassault Rafale B Dassault Mirage 2000D; Dassault/Dornier Alpha Jet; SOCATA TBM 700

Escadron de chasse et d'expérimentation 1/30 Côte d'Argent is a French Air and Space Force (Armée de l'air et de l'espace) Squadron located at BA 118 Mont-de-Marsan Air Base, Landes, France which operates the Dassault Rafale B, Dassault Mirage 2000D, Dassault/Dornier Alpha Jet and the SOCATA TBM 700.

== See also ==
- List of French Air and Space Force aircraft squadrons
