= Mont-de-Marsan Air Base =

Mont-de-Marsan Air Base Base aérienne 118 Mont-de-Marsan
- IATA: None; ICAO: LFBM

Summary
- Airport type: Military
- Owner: Government of France
- Operator: Armée de l'air et de l'espace
- Location: Mont-de-Marsan, Landes
- Elevation AMSL: 203 ft / 62 m
- Coordinates: 43°54′42″N 00°30′33″W

Map
- Location of airport in Nouvelle-Aquitaine region

Runways
Direction	Length		Surface
Direction	m	ft	Surface
09/27	3,603	11,821	Asphalt

Mont-de-Marsan Air Base (French: Base aérienne 118 Mont-de-Marsan) (ICAO: LFBM) is a front-line French Air and Space Force (Armée de l'air et de l'espace) (ALAE) fighter base located approximately 2 km north of Mont-de-Marsan, in the Landes department of the Nouvelle-Aquitaine region in southwestern France. The airport is at an elevation of 203 feet (62 m) above mean sea level. It has one runway designated 09/27 with an asphalt surface measuring 3,603 metres (11,821 ft) in length.

The Air Base is home to two squadrons of Dassault Rafale, the most advanced French fighter aircraft. The base includes Centre d'Essais des Matériels Aéronautiques - CEMA (the French air force military experimentation and trials organisation), an air defense radar command reporting centre, and an air defence control training site.

The base is named after Colonel Constantin Rozanoff.

The airbase was formerly home to France's first operational squadron of nuclear bombers, the Dassault Mirage IVA.

Units:

- Escadron de chasse et d'expérimentation 1/30 Côte d'Argent with Dassault Rafale B, Dassault Mirage 2000D, Dassault/Dornier Alpha Jet and the SOCATA TBM 700
- Escadron de Chasse 2/30 Normandie-Niemen with the Dassault Rafale C
- Escadron de Chasse 3/30 Lorraine with the Dassault Rafale C
