= Meyenheim =

Commune in Grand Est, France

- Commune
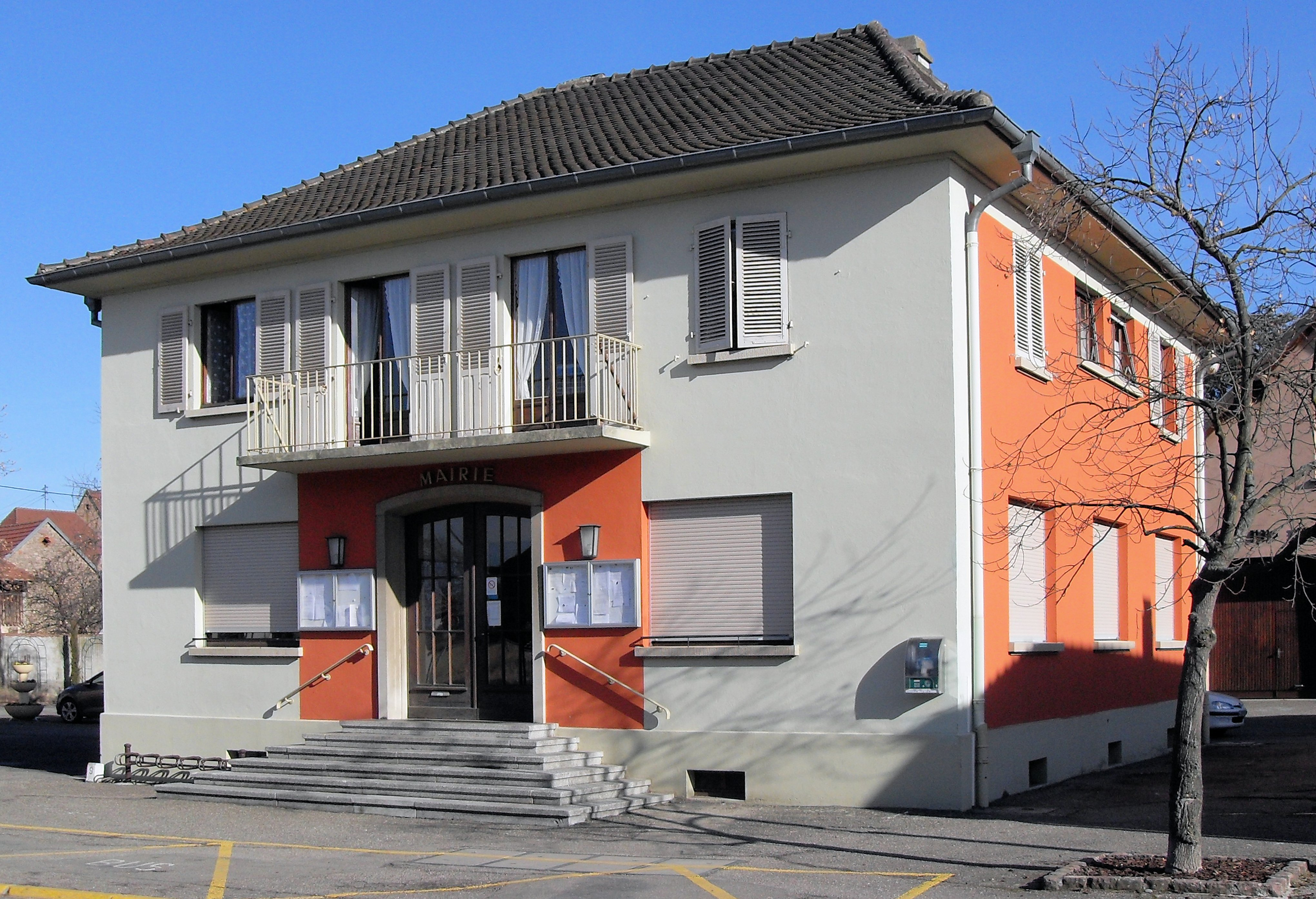
- The town hall in Meyenheim

- Coat of arms
- Location of Meyenheim
- Location within France Location within Grand Est
- Coordinates: 47°54′51″N 7°21′23″E
- Country: France
- Region: Grand Est
- Department: Haut-Rhin
- Arrondissement: Thann-Guebwiller
- Canton: Ensisheim
- Intercommunality: Centre Haut-Rhin

Government
  - Mayor (2020–2026): Françoise Boog
- Area^{1}: 12.78 km^{2} (4.93 sq mi)
- Elevation: 210 m (690 ft)
- Highest elevation: 213 m (699 ft)
- Lowest elevation: 206 m (676 ft)
- Population (2023): 2,015
  - Density: 157.7/km^{2} (408.4/sq mi)
- Time zone: UTC+01:00 (CET)
  - Summer (DST): UTC+02:00 (CEST)
- INSEE/Postal code: 68205 /68890
- ^{1} French Land Register data, which excludes lakes, ponds, glaciers > 1 km^{2} (0.386 sq mi or 247 acres) and river estuaries.

Meyenheim (German: Meienheim) is a commune in the Haut-Rhin department in Grand Est in north-eastern France. It lies on the Ill river, 12 km east of Soultz-Haut-Rhin.

== Population ==
Historical population
Year	Pop.	±% p.a.
1968	1,080	—
1975	1,041	−0.52%
1982	1,003	−0.53%
1990	884	−1.57%
1999	957	+0.89%
2007	1,219	+3.07%
2012	1,742	+7.40%
2017	1,480	−3.21%
2023	2,015	+5.28%
Source: INSEE

== See also ==
- Communes of the Haut-Rhin département
