= Reims-Champagne Air Base =

Reims-Champagne Air Base Base aérienne 112 Advanced Landing Ground (ALG) A-62
- IATA: RHE; ICAO: LFSR

Summary
- Airport type: Military
- Owner: Government of France
- Operator: Armée de l'air
- Serves: Reims, France
- Location: Bétheny, France
- Elevation AMSL: 314 ft (96 m)
- Coordinates: 49°18′37″N 004°03′03″E

Map
- Location of Reims – Champagne Air Base

Runways
Direction	Length		Surface
Direction	m	ft	Surface
07/25	2,482	8,143	Asphalt
- Source: French AIP

Reims-Champagne Air Base (French: Base aérienne 112 Reims-Champagne) (IATA: RHE, ICAO: LFSR) is a former Front-line French Air and Space Force (French: Armée de l'Air) air base. The base is located approximately 4 miles (6.4 km) north of Reims; about 81 miles (130 km) northeast of Paris.

== Squadrons and aircraft ==
- 2 reconnaissance squadrons equipped with Dassault Mirage F1CR.

01/33 Belfort
02/33 Savoie

== History ==
Reims Air Base was authorized by the French Air Ministry in 1925 and was opened in October 1928. Much work was needed to restore the land in the area after the ravages of the World War I Western Front, and the myriad of trenches built, all needed to be filled in, the land leveled, unexploded ordnance removed and have a graded, smooth grass surface for airplane operations as well as a support facility. Reims was planned to be the "showcase" base of the Armée de l'Air. It had a concrete parking apron; hangars and a support area, and consisted of a grass field for aircraft takeoffs and landings.

The first unit to arrive at Reims was the Breguet 19–equipped 12th Regiment, which arrived from the Occupied Rhineland airdrome at Lachen-Speyerdorf.

During the 1930s, the base was greatly expanded and modernized. Known units assigned to BA 112 during the decade were:

- 4th Fighter Wing (1933)
- 5th Fighter Wing (1936–1937)
- 601st Infantry Group of the Air (1937) – the only parachute unit of the Air Force.
- II/13 Group (1939) – Night Fighter Unit

With the breakout of World War II in 1939, Reims was reinforced with additional units. In May 1940, the following units were stationed at Reims BA 112:

- I/15 Group, equipped with 11 Farman F.222
- II/15 Group, equipped with 9 Farman F.222

In addition, RAF units of the RAF Advanced Air Striking Force were attached to Reims equipped with Fairey Battles 226 Squadron.

The base was seized by the Germans in June 1940 during the Battle of France. In 1941 the Luftwaffe designated the base a "Flugplatz A213/XI" and it became a maintenance and repair depot for Junkers aircraft, in particular Junkers Ju 88s. It was attacked by Eighth Air Force bombers beginning in the second half of 1943, with a particular damaging raid in April 1944. It was also the target of numerous night leaflet drops aimed at resistance forces in the area.

It was liberated by Allied ground forces 30 August 1944 during the Northern France Campaign. Almost immediately, the United States Army Air Forces IX Engineer Command 850th Engineer Aviation Battalion cleared the airport of mines and destroyed Luftwaffe aircraft. Fortunately, little battle damage was sustained, and Reims-Champaigne airfield became a USAAF Ninth Air Force combat airfield, designated as "A-62" the same day of its liberation. The combat engineers laid down a 5000' Pierced Steel Planking all weather runway, aligned northeast–southwest (05/23), along with an almost parallel 5000' turf runway (06/24).

Under American control, Ninth Air Force assigned the 440th Troop Carrier Group to the base, flying C-47 Skytrain transports until the end of September. On 19 September, the 373d Fighter Group moved in with P-47 Thunderbolts which flew combat missions in eastern France until the end of October when it moved up closer to the front lines. Afterward, Reims became a resupply and casualty evacuation airfield, as well as liaison aircraft assigned to Allied headquarters in the city. The Americans returned full control of the airport to French authorities July 1945.

After the war, Reims Air Base became a massive aircraft storage depot for surplus (mostly American) aircraft. From Reims, aircraft were sold under the Military Assistance Program to France and other Western European countries; to private individuals, and some to scrapyards for metal reclamation.

== From 1945 ==
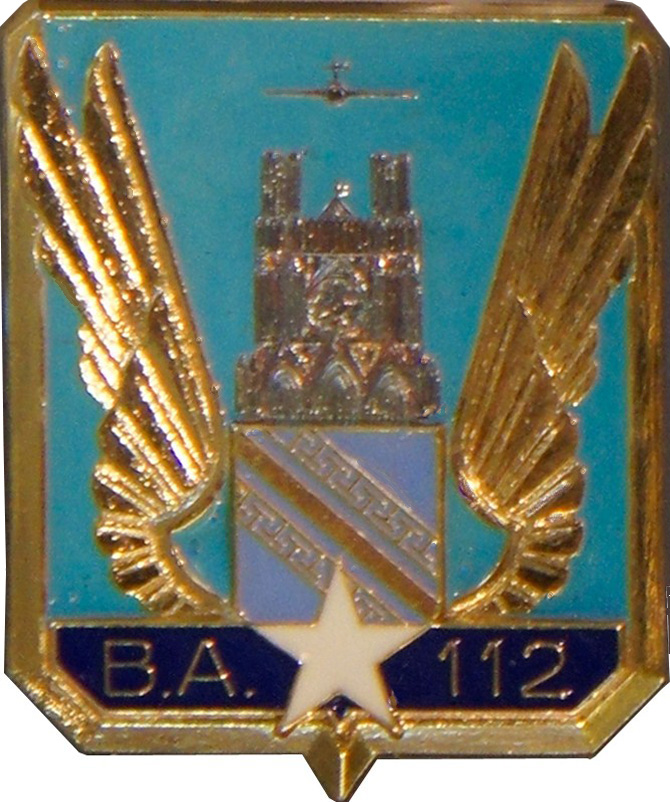
BA112 insignia .

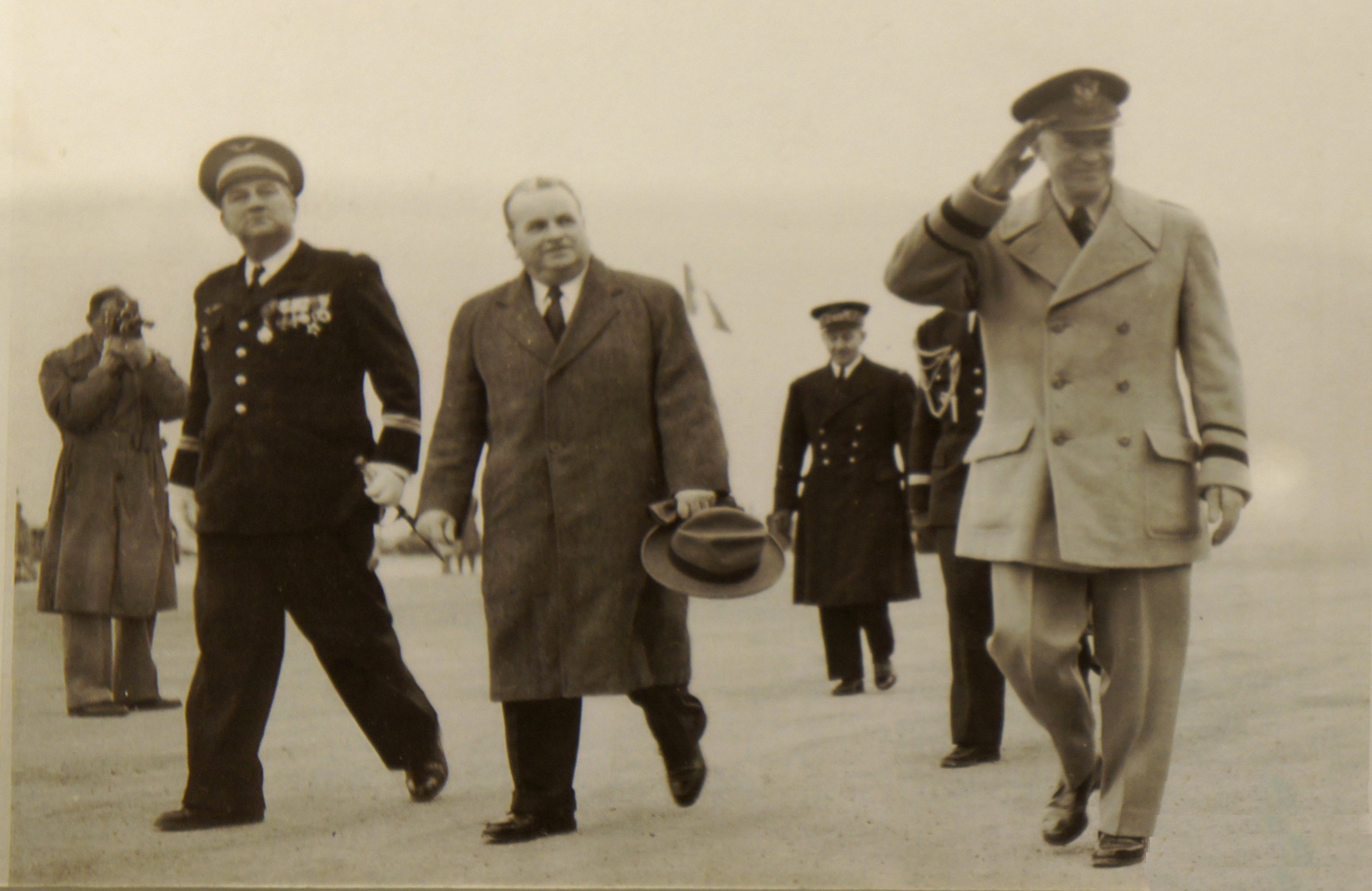
Eisenhower on BA112 in 1951 .

The base was reactivated in 1949 as an active French Air Force base. The infrastructure of the base, which was badly damaged by the Allied bombing raids of the Junkers works during the war was torn down and replaced with new, modern buildings. The American perforated steel planking (PSP) runway and grass landing strips were removed, although the outline of the wartime runway can be seen in aerial photography, somewhat blurred for security .

A jet-capable 8000' jet runway and taxiways were laid down to the southwest along with additional aircraft ramp space, dispersals with hardened Tab-Vs, hangars and a support area. Initially de Havilland Vampires were assigned to the base in 1950; later Republic F-84 Thunderjets, and in 1959, North American F-100 Super Sabres. French Air Force units deployed from Reims to Egypt during the 1956 Suez Crisis, and also to Cyprus. In June 1966, Escadron de Chasse 2/30 Normandie-Niemen arrived, which would stay for decades. In 1973, the Mirage F1 was assigned.

EC 2/30 was redesignated and then left in 1993. In 2008 it was announced that the base would be closed. The last aircraft departed in July 2011 and the air base definitively closed in June 2012. In 2014, the air-base hosted the annual May teknival, but it is otherwise derelict.

== See also ==
- Advanced landing ground
- List of French Air and Space Force aircraft squadrons
