= History of the Armée de l'Air in the colonies (1939–1962) =

This article deals with the history of the French air force in colonial territories from World War II to the post-colonial period.

== Indochina (1939–1940) ==
The outbreak of the war in Europe in September 1939 did not immediately affect the status of the Armée de l'Air in French Indochina because it had the task of defending a wide area of Southeast Asia, including the future Laos, Cambodia and Vietnam. And yet its array of airplanes seemed inadequate to perform any kind of real defense against any incursion by an enemy, because there were less than 100 airplanes available to it, all obsolescent or obsolete. In September 1931, Japan invaded and occupied Manchuria. This was an area of northeast China, which encompassed the provinces of Jilin, Liaoning and Heilongjiang. Nearly six whole years later, in July 1937, the Second Sino-Japanese War had begun. As yet, the French colonial authorities were hoping that the Japanese would not be brazen enough to take on the might of a European power. However, it became increasingly likely after the German invasion of Poland in September 1939, since Japan was part of the Axis alliance and thus Germany's ally.

On September 26, 1940, Japanese troops landed in Haiphong, violating a cease-fire which had been signed only the previous day. From the middle of the following month, the French became heavily involved in repelling Japanese army assaults.

== The French-Thai War (1940–1941) ==
Following the Fall of France in 1940, Thais perceived a chance to regain the territories they had lost years earlier. The collapse of Metropolitan France made the French hold on Indochina tenuous. After the Japanese invasion of French Indochina in September 1940, the French were forced to allow the Japanese to set up military bases. This seemingly subservient behavior convinced the Thai regime that Vichy France would not seriously resist a confrontation with Thailand.

French forces in Indochina consisted of an army of approximately fifty thousand men, The most obvious deficiency of the French army lay in its shortage of armor; however, the Armée de l'Air had in its inventory approximately a hundred aircraft, of which around sixty could be considered first line. These consisted of thirty Potez 25 TOEs, four Farman 221s, six Potez 542s, nine Morane M.S.406s, and eight Loire 130 flying boats.

The Thai Army was a relatively well-equipped force. Consisting of some sixty thousand men, with artillery and tanks. The Royal Thai Navy—consisting of several vessels, including two coastal defence ships, twelve torpedo boats and four submarines—was inferior to the French naval forces, but the Royal Thai Air Force held both a quantitative and qualitative edge over l'Armee de l'Air. Among the 140 aircraft that composed the air force's first-line strength were twenty-four Mitsubishi Ki-30 light bombers, nine Mitsubishi Ki-21 and six Martin B-10 twin-engine bombers, seventy Vought Corsair dive bombers, and twenty-five Curtiss Hawk 75 fighters.

While nationalistic demonstrations and anti-French rallies were held in Bangkok, border skirmishes erupted along the Mekong frontier. The superior Royal Thai Air Force conducted daytime bombing runs over Vientiane, Sisophon, and Battambang with impunity. The French retaliated with their own planes, but the damage caused was less than equal. The activities of the Thai air force, particularly in the field of dive-bombing, was such that Admiral Jean Decoux, the governor of French Indochina, grudgingly remarked that the Thai planes seemed to have been flown by men with plenty of war experience.

In early January 1941, the Thai Burapha and Isan Armies launched their offensive on Laos and Cambodia. French resistance was instantaneous, but many units were simply swept along by the better-equipped Thai forces. The Thais swiftly took Laos, but Cambodia proved a much harder nut to crack.

On January 16, 1941 the French launched a large counterattack on the Thai-held villages of Yang Dang Khum and Phum Preav, initiating the fiercest battle of the war. Because of over-complicated orders and nonexistent intelligence, the French counterattacks were cut to pieces and fighting ended with a French withdrawal from the area. The Thais were unable to pursue the retreating French, as their forward tanks were kept in check by the gunnery of French Foreign Legion artillerists.

On January 24, the final air battle took place when Thai bombers raided the French airfield at Angkor near Siem Reap. The last Thai mission commenced at 0710 hours on January 28, when the Martins of the 50th Bomber Squadron set out on a raid on Sisophon, escorted by three Hawk 75Ns of the 60th Fighter Squadron.

The Japanese mediated the conflict, and a general armistice was arranged to go into effect on January 28. On May 9 a peace treaty was signed in Tokyo, with the French being coerced by the Japanese into relinquishing their hold on the disputed territories.

About 30% of the French aircraft were rendered unserviceable by the end of the war, some as a result of minor damage sustained in air raids that remained unrepaired. The Armée de l'Air admitted the loss of one Farman F221 and two Morane M.S.406s destroyed on the ground, but in reality its losses were greater.

In the course of its first experience of combat, the Royal Thai Air Force claimed to have shot down five French aircraft and destroyed seventeen on the ground, for the loss of three of its own in the air and another five to ten destroyed in French air raids on Thai airfields.

== Post Pearl Harbor 1941–1945 ==
The month of December 1941 was a watershed in the war in the Pacific, yet the French aircraft were more or less left to deteriorate on the ground from that time on as Japan began, firstly, to impose what would today be termed "no-fly" zones over the conquered territory and, subsequently, to demand that airfields in French control be surrendered. Cut off from (Nazi-occupied) Europe, the Armée de l'Air in Indochina became an air force virtually in name only, as lack of fuel and spares kept aircraft grounded, forcing the authorities to strike them off charge progressively as the war progressed.

In March 1945, Japan decided to neutralize altogether the token French presence in Indochina, initially by capturing the high-ranking French service chiefs at their headquarters in the capital, Saigon. Despite having fewer than 30 antiquated aircraft remaining in serviceable condition, though, the Armée de l'Air responded to this aggression and inflicted heavy casualties on Japanese troops, who were pursuing French forces withdrawing towards China, where they did benefit from being re-armed with U.S.-built hardware.

== First Indochina War (1945–1954) ==
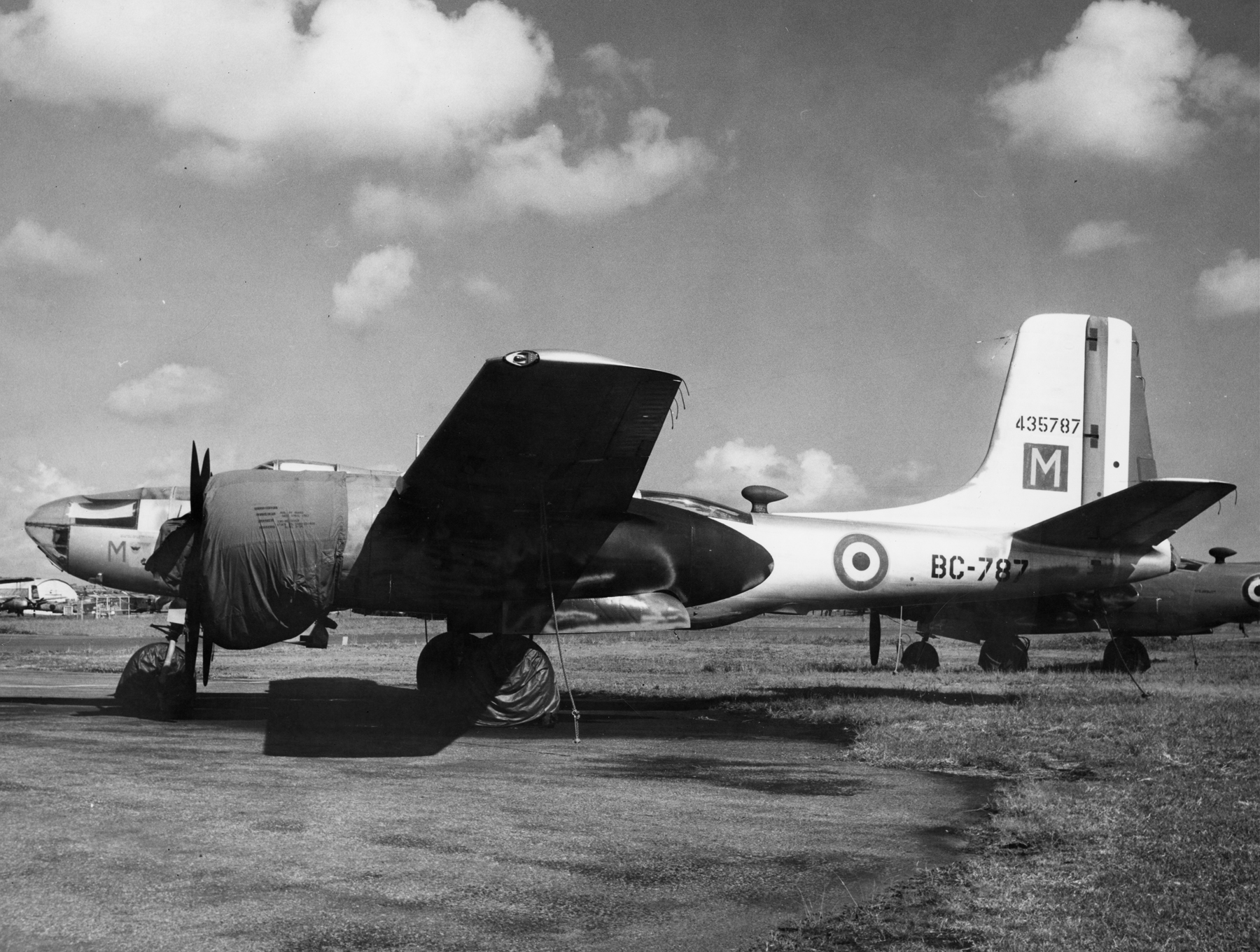
A French A-26C in Indochina.

Japan, even though a defeated power by the summer of 1945, exploited long-standing Vietnamese resentment of French colonialism. The first signs of the beginning of the end of the French empire in Indochina came when Vietnamese insurgents attacked and killed French residents in Saigon, prompting the French to send in a combat command (light brigade) of Leclerc's old 2nd Armored Division, among other troops, to help restore order. The Armée de l'Air reinforced the army units in the guise of the so-called Groupe marchant de l'extrême-orient (the Far East Forward Group), which included U.S.-built aircraft such as the ubiquitous Douglas C-47 Skytrain, totaling eighteen in number after reinforcements had been brought in. In November 1945, the personnel of the 1st Fighter Wing (consisting of GC I/7 and II/7) arrived in Saigon, but without airplanes. Later on, those units received the F.VIII and F.IX variants of the British Supermarine Spitfire. However, the complement was completed with seized Japanese aircraft, mostly ones dedicated to liaison duties. Although the C-47s were not bombers, a lot of them were jury-rigged in order to fulfill bombing missions over the nine years which remained to the French empire in Indochina. By March 1946, the Armée de l'Air consisted of four units, two of which were fighter units equipped with the Spitfire F.IX, a transport/bombing unit equipped with the C-47 and a further one consisting of examples of the Junkers Ju 52/3m. Indeed, the only French-built aircraft available were Morane-Saulnier MS.500 and Nord NC.702 liaison aircraft, which would be used for observation and evacuation duties as well. (The MS.500 was actually a copy of the German Fieseler Fi 156 "Storch" (Stork) aircraft.). By March 1947, the "Cigognes" and "Alsace" fighter groups had come to Indochina, and they had been joined by the "Corse" group, equipped with the de Havilland Mosquito. However, just as their RAF counterparts had experienced when stationed in Burma during World War II, the aircraft, dubbed the "Wooden Wonder" by the British, began to deteriorate as a result of their exposure to a climate that they were not designed to operate in at all. That same month, the Nam-Dinh garrison was encircled, so the transport groups were called upon to drop over 350 airborne troops in order to relieve the besieged troops and thus break the enemy's encirclement. Little by little, the insurgents, fighting the French as a guerrilla army, began to perfect the art and science of guerrilla warfare.

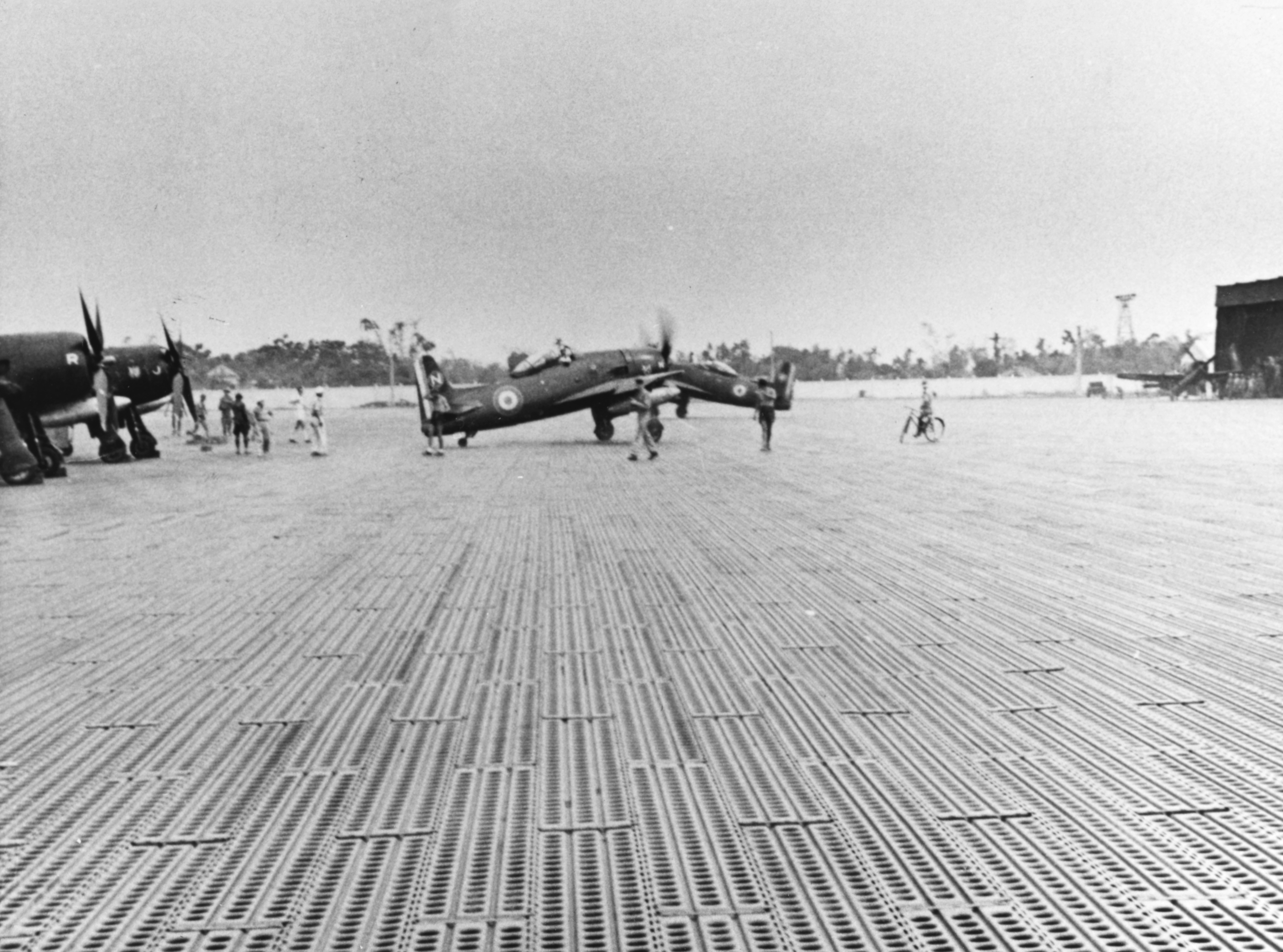
Frenchs Grumman F8F Bearcat in Đà Nẵng, 1954.

The future capitals of North and South Vietnam would witness the presence of Armée de l'Air fighter units during the summer and autumn of 1949, as the situation began to deteriorate. Units were relocated from North Africa to Indochina, including I/5 "Vendée" and II/5 "Ile de France" which were equipped with the Bell P-63 and would remain in theater until January 1951. Firstly, they were stationed at Saigon's main military airbase at Tan Son Nhut before being relocated to the future North Vietnamese capital, where II/6, better known as the famous and highly decorated "Normandie-Niemen" fighter regiment from their stint in the Soviet Union between 1942 and 1945, joined them. They were certainly needed, as they participated in counterattacks against Việt Minh guerrillas encircling French army positions in the Tonkin region.

Fresh from establishing the People's Republic, the new Maoist government of mainland China began to provide logistical support to the insurgents short of actually supplying troops, something that China would do during the war in Korea, which would start in late June 1950. Communist expansion into what remained of "free" South-East Asia (apart from Japan, which was still under U.S. occupation at the time) seemed inevitable, and so the U.S. government under Harry S. Truman began to revise their position. In March, General Hartmann, who commanded the Armée de l'Air in Indochina until his death in an air crash in April 1951, wanted to create a "Battle Air Corps" composed of four fighter, two bomber and four transport groups. Jets were in service with the U.S. Air Force and the U.S. Navy at this time, yet Hartmann believed that they were actually not up to the task of dealing with insurgents as opposed to fighting conventional armies on the ground.

As a result, piston-engined fighters, such as the F8F Bearcat, an aircraft from the Grumman stable with one of the most powerful piston engines ever developed for a single-engined aircraft, the Pratt & Whitney P&W R-2800 radial engine, would be used to combat the insurgents. With this powerful engine (2100 hp), the Bearcat was probably the fastest propeller-driven aircraft with a maximum speed of over 450 mph. (The Americans would follow their lead in their war against the Việt Minh by using the Douglas A-1 Skyraider piston-engined aircraft during the 1960s.) For the task of dropping large "hardware" on guerrilla groups, the twin-engined bomber Douglas B-26 Invader would also be chosen. A revised command structure for the Armée de l'Air in Indochina was also put in effect with the creation of three Groupes aériens tacticques (Gatac) ("Aerial Tactical Groups"): Gatac North in Hanoi, Gatac Center in Hué and Gatac South in Saigon/Tan Son Nhut. Renewed fighting between the French and the insurgents (in the guise of the 308th and 312th Divisions, commanded by Võ Nguyên Giáp) broke out in January 1951 at Vĩnh Yên, located in the Tonkin region. Air cover for the French army's "mobile groups" led by de Lattre was provided by two fighter groups, namely III/6 "Roussillon" and I/9 "Limousin", which were able to muster about forty P-63s, and these were reinforced by eight F6Fs lent from II/6 "Normandie Niemen" and I/6 "Corse." During the month, more than 1,700 fighter sorties were flown by 114 out of the 147 aircraft, mostly from Gatac North, then in service protecting Hanoi, while the "Normandie-Niemen" fighter group was charged with the protection of the southern sector. French bombing capability was very much enhanced with the operational missions flown by dedicated B-26 bombers, assigned to GB I/19 "Gascogne", during the battle for Mao-Khe (which was the center of the coal mine region in northern Vietnam, and its loss would hurt the French) to protect Haiphong. Giap himself was partly to blame for the fact that the Việt Minh had been trounced, since air power, which had seen Vĩnh Yên remain in French hands, and naval power, which had seen Mạo Khê remain in French hands, were beyond his experience, and he had thus not planned for them.

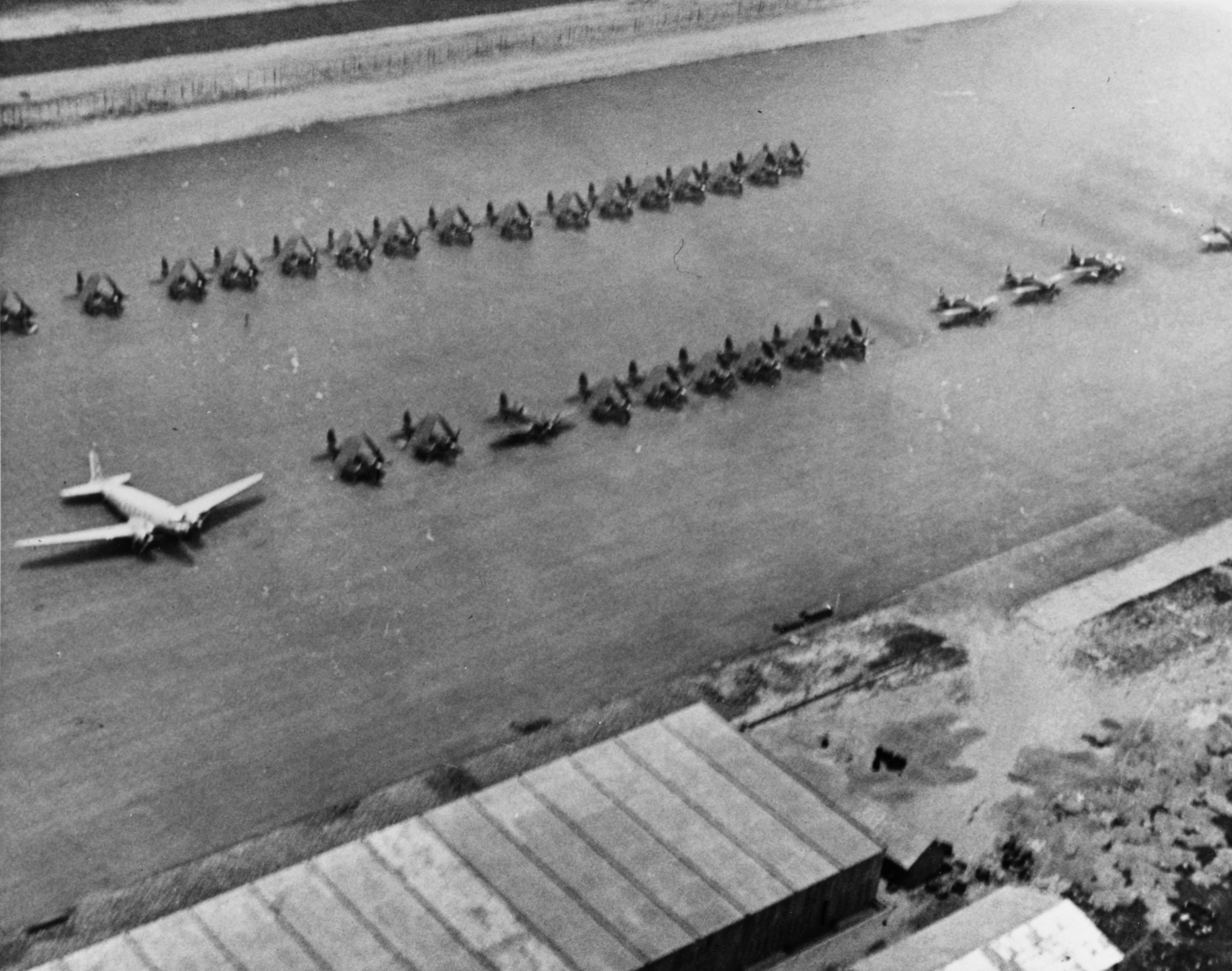
Tourane Airfield, Indochina (Da Nang, Vietnam), showing the newly constructed metal mat parking area on northeast side of runway. New construction is visible in the foreground, the taxiway in the background. The camera is pointed northwest. Visible are 25 Vought F4U-7/AU-1 Corsairs, four Grumman F8F Bearcats and a single Douglas C-47 Skytrain. April 1954.

The Armée de l'Air, now under the command of Chassin, Hartmann's successor, managed to support the French army in repelling a new insurgency from late May to early June 1951, having at its disposal some 48 F8Fs and 23 P-63s in the fighter groups, yet its bomber arm was down to a mere eight B-26s. In support were a combined total of 40 C-47s and Ju 52s. Several months later, after about 6,000 French troops had been killed by Việt Minh insurgents, General Jean de Lattre de Tassigny became commander-in-chief of all the then-190,000-strong French Expeditionary Corps in Indochina (having previously been the commander-in-chief of the Free French forces during the Second World War). He decided to reverse the trend and have the French armed forces adopt an offensive stance as opposed to a defensive one. De lattre won crushing victories at Vinh yen, Mao khé and on the Day. The viet minh never attacked again hanoï after this. But he was the nrapatrieted to France without have destroyed the viet minh. He would die of cancer in January 1952 after being promoted—almost posthumously—to the rank of Marshal of France. Despite Chassin's call for substantial reinforcements for the Armée de l'Air, whose personnel in theater had been subject to the punishing pace of conducting operations for months, it was ignored. Gatac-Laos, grouping fighters and bombers aircraft which had been requisitioned from various units, was created as a reaction to a Việt Minh offensive in Laos, launched in April 1953. Three months later, 56 F8Fs and ten B-26s, as well as MS.500s and helicopters, participated in Operation Hirondelle ("Swallow"), whose objective was to destroy the matériel provided to the insurgents by Maoist China, yet the Việt Minh did not suffer significantly as a result. The arms were being transported along what became famous as the so-called "Ho Chi Minh trail", and, in November 1953, to counter this, the French military decided to choose a site near the border with Laos, from which missions could be launched to strike against both Giap's insurgent army in order to eliminate it altogether. Its name was Dien Bien Phu, and it became operational on the 24th of the month, four days after General Henri Navarre launched Operation "Castor".

== Dien Bien Phu: the last gasp in Indochina (January–May 1954) ==
By the beginning of 1954, Dien Bien Phu alone required 20 C-119s and 50 C-47s, so, on January 2, Navarre's second-in-command asked for additional aircraft and crews under the so-called "Navarre Plan." U.S. President Eisenhower, fearing both domestic and international backlashes if he were to send in U.S. troops, sent an American mission to Indochina to determine the extent of help that the French needed. Following a personal letter from the French prime minister, Joseph Laniel, Eisenhower authorized the loan of aircraft with French markings painted on them and flown by crews from Civil Air Transport (CAT), a commercial airline, which had been started in 1946 by then-retired Major General Chennault, the famous commander of the American Volunteer Group (AVG), better known as the "Flying Tigers", in China during World War II, and then purchased by the CIA in the year war broke out in Korea. He further authorized the dispatch of American "specialists" to Indochina, that is, mechanics from the Far East Air Force (FEAF) of the USAF. Once sworn to secrecy owing to the political ramifications of their presence, they would go to work on B-26s at Da Nang (then called Tourane) in the south and on C-47s at Do Son, located south of Haiphong, in the north, respectively. (In fact, Eisenhower was so concerned about their presence, which itself caused the Chinese government to label the American mechanics as "combatants", that he told U.S. Secretary of State John Foster Dulles that he wanted them withdrawn by the end of June 1954 no matter what the situation in Indochina was at that time.)

The first Việt Minh artillery attacks against the base came on March 16, 1954, as a result of which six French F8Fs, five MS.500s and two helicopters were destroyed. The French response could only come from bases located in the northern sector. The Armée de l'Air mustered two fighter groups with F8Fs, two bomber groups with B-26s, while the Aéronavale (naval aviation) could muster F6F Hellcats, SB2C Helldivers, F4AU-1 and four-engined PB4Y Privateers (navalized versions of the B-24 Liberator heavy bomber). The transport groups provided approximately 100 C-47s, but there were also the twelve Fairchild C-119Cs "Boxcars" crewed by 24 CAT personnel, to air-drop to the French garrison personnel, food, ammunition, and artillery pieces, as well as tons of barbed wire and other supplies. There was some initial friction between the French and the Americans, as the French commander at the base lodged complaints that the CAT crews were not actually following instructions directly, though this was more to do with a language barrier, as few, if any, of the CAT crews had any Francophone linguistic skills that could allow them to communicate well with the French air traffic controllers. Fortunately, the French garrison included British-born Legionnaires, so they were used as interpreters. As a result, the 37 CAT pilots excelled at their duties, flying a total of 682 missions over Dien Bien Phu and earning the respect of the French. (This respect was finally recognized half a century later when seven of the surviving CAT pilots were created Chevaliers de la Légion d'Honneur at a special ceremony at the French embassy in Washington, D.C., on February 24, 2005.)

At the same time, however, the insurgents were equipped with Soviet-made weaponry, including 37-mm antiaircraft guns, which were to take a toll of the U.S. and French aircraft trying to attack their forces, including with napalm, in an effort to repel them and thus relieve the besieged garrison, which eventually capitulated to Giap's troops on May 7, 1954. In total, the French lost sixty-two aircraft destroyed or severely damaged in the last major battle fought in French Indochina, which, as a colony, was consigned to history with the signing of an agreement in Geneva in July to carve up Vietnam into two countries along the 17th parallel. France, though, was permitted to maintain a small military presence in the new Republic of Vietnam, known to the West as South Vietnam, and the Americans still present were also permitted to remain, servicing the Armée de l'Air's contingent of B-26s and C-47s, plus the C-119s. They even packed parachutes for French airborne troops. The Americans left Vietnam eventually on September 6, 1954, albeit five days after the original leaving date promised by the French. Other Armée de l'Air units were meanwhile dedicating itself to the training of Vietnamese Air Force (VNAF) technical and flight personnel at Nha-Trang.

== Algeria: the last days of empire in North Africa (1954–1962) ==
After the fall of the French empire in Indochina, the French Empire was crumbling, as more and more countries vied for independence from Paris. Yet the post-1945 era was one of massive decolonization, and France was having to deal with the realities that went with being a colonial power.

France still maintained a sizable presence in North Africa with countries such as Algeria, Morocco and Tunisia as colonies. Yet uprisings were on the rise in the 1950s, undoubtedly inspired by the Việt Minh victory over French expeditionary forces, as it showed that a "mighty" European power could be dislodged from "conquered" territory.

To meet this threat, the French expanded their presence in North Africa. For the Armée de l'Air in particular, it meant being equipped primarily with U.S.-built aircraft, as had been the case in Indochina. One bomber type in the French armory was the B-26 Invader, equipped with two Pratt & Whitney R-2800 engines. The B-26 began to equip two bombardment wings from the autumn of 1956 onwards based in Algeria, starting with GB 1/91 Gascogne, based at Oran la Senia, followed three months later by GB 2/91 Guyenne based at Bône in eastern Algeria. The B-26 was used in four versions. The B-26B, with a solid nose equipped with 6 to 8 12,7 mm machines-guns and B-26C glass nosed aircraft were used as bombers and for close air support with rockets, bombs and napalm. The famous Norden bombsight fitted to B-26C's could help bombardiers to aim bombs (up to two tons) on targets accurately, even in bad weather. The RB-26 photo-reconnaissance version was used by ERP.1/32 Armagnac. In terms of organizational practice, four RB-26s were grouped alongside 16 B-26s. All these aircraft were designated to perform combat duties at a maximum range of some 600 kilometers from base with a maximum duration of 20 minutes over the target, or else up to 800 kilometers from base with a very short duration over the target. The final version was unofficially called the B-26N, a B-26C converted into a night fighter to interdict planes smuggling weapons from Tunisia. The glass nose was re-designed and equipped with British AI Mk.X radar taken from Meteor NF.11's. The B-26N was armed with two underwing gun pods with two 12,7 mm machine guns each and two rocket pods for air-to-air rockets.

The armor on the B-26 made it a particularly useful and versatile aircraft for both bombing and counter-insurgency operations. On March 15, 1957, for example, in the Nord-Constantanois area, a force of no less than 12 B-26s was sent to destroy insurgents hiding in the Movis forest. However, one mission flown on July 15, 1959, witnessed the use of napalm. French army paratroopers had been brought to a standstill by a rebel group near Rafaa, allowing the rebels to control a significant amount of terrain. A B-26 from GB 2/91 took off from Oran, armed with four containers of napalm under the wings. Contact with the army paratroopers proved to be difficult initially, and bad visibility—because it was already dark—did not help when the B-26 flew so low that it clipped some trees only meters away from the paratroopers themselves. Worse was that the radio became temporarily inoperable. It was up to the pilot himself to release the napalm on his target even if he was flying at high speed and at (very) low altitude. Probably through blind luck, he managed to drop his load without endangering the lives of the paratroopers.

== See also ==
- French colonial flags
- French Colonial Empire
- List of French possessions and colonies
