= Groupe de Chasse =

French air force unit

Groupe de Chasse or groupe de chasse (usually abbreviated as GC) is the French language term for "fighter group" or "fighter wing". More literal translations include "pursuit group" (the US term for fighter groups prior to 1942) and "hunting group" (similar to the German language Jagdgruppe or JG).

== Composition ==
A group de chasse may include one to four escadrilles, each of which comprises 10–12 aircraft. The commanding officer of a GC is usually a Commandant, Lieutenant-colonel or Colonel.

Specific units known by the name groupe de chasse include:

== France ==
Including:

- Armee de l'Air
- Armée de l'air de Vichy
- Forces Aériennes Françaises Libres

Groupe de Chasse 1

Groupe de Chasse I/1
Groupe de Chasse II/1

Groupe de Chasse 2

Groupe de Chasse I/2 - became No. 329 Squadron RAF and then Escadron de Chasse 1/2 Cigognes
Groupe de Chasse III/2 (GC Alsace)
Groupe de Chasse IV/2 (Île-de-France)

Groupe de Chasse III Normandie-Niemen

Groupe de Chasse I/3
Groupe de Chasse III/3

Groupe de Chasse 5

Groupe de Chasse II/5

Groupe de Chasse 6

Groupe de Chasse II/6
Groupe de Chasse III/6

Groupe de Chasse 8

Groupe de Chasse I/8
Groupe de Chasse II/8

Groupe de Chasse 9

Groupe de Chasse II/9
Groupe de Chasse III/9

Groupes 10 and 13

Groupe de Chasse II/10
Groupe de Chasse III/10
Groupe de Chasse I/13
Groupe de Chasse III/13

Groupe de Chasse 145

Groupe de Chasse Polonaise I/145 (a Polish unit of the French Air Force in 1940)

== Belgium ==
Groupe de Chasse (Belgium)
a Belgian unit of World War I
