= Escadron de Chasse 2/5 Île-de-France =

Fighter Squadron 2/5 Île-de-France
- Escadron de Chasse 2/5 Île-de-France
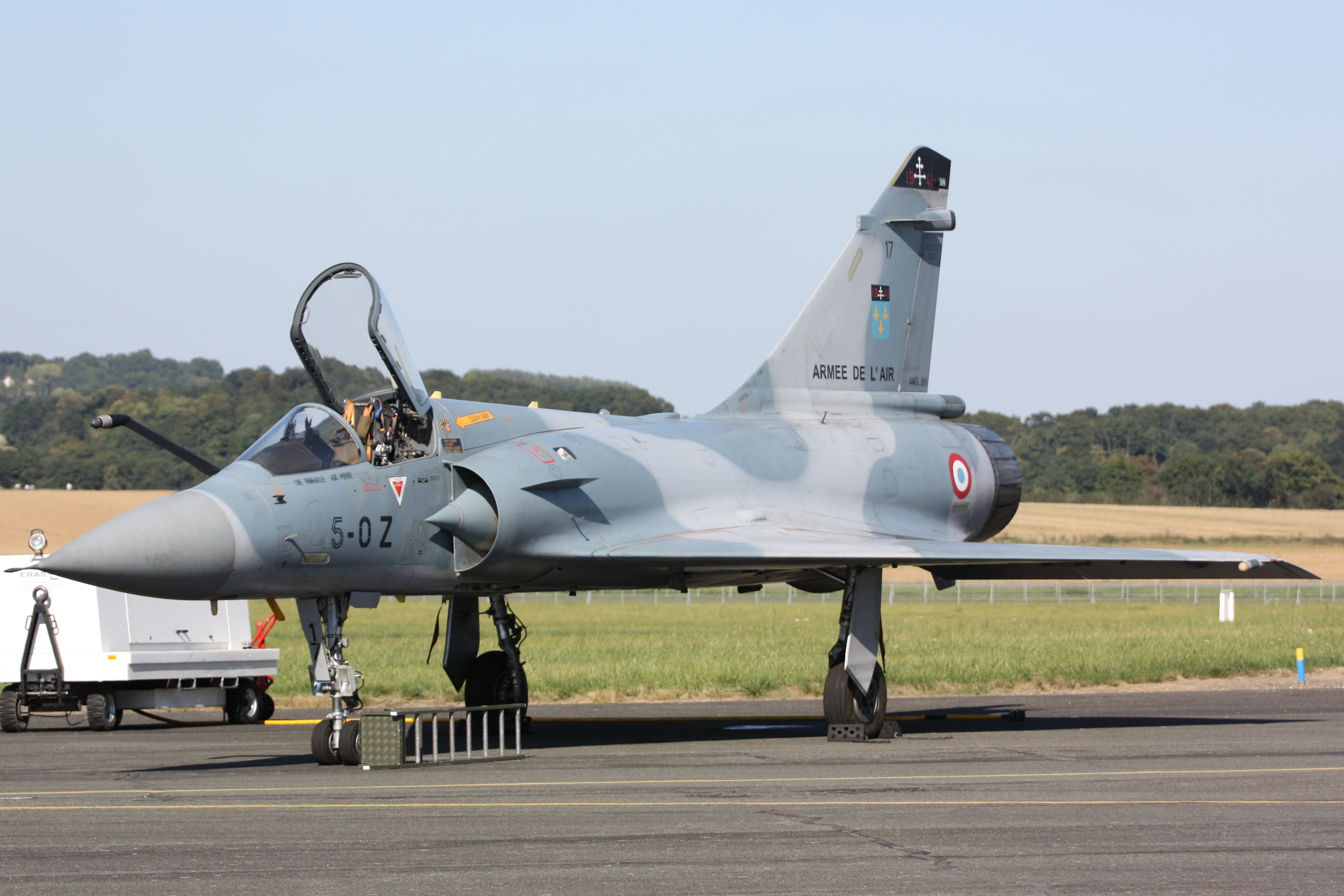
- Dassault Mirage 2000C
- Active: November 7, 1941 - June 22, 2022
- Country: France
- Branch: Armée de l'air et de l'espace
- Type: Fighter aircraft
- Role: Aerial Defense
- Part of: Fighter Brigade
- Garrison/HQ: Base Aérienne 115 Orange-Caritat
- Decorations: War Cross 1939–1945 (Croix de guerre 1939–1945); War Cross for foreign operational theaters (Croix de guerre des théâtres d'opérations extérieures)

Aircraft flown
- Fighter: Dassault Mirage 2000C RDI; Dassault Mirage 2000B RDI

Escadron de Chasse 2/5 Île-de-France (Fighter Squadron 2/5 Île-de-France) was a French Air and Space Force (Armée de l'air et de l'espace) fighter squadron previously stationed at Base Aérienne 115 Orange-Caritat (ICAO: LFMO) and were equipped with the Dassault Mirage 2000C fighter aircraft and Mirage 2000B for training and conversion. The squadron's planes used to carry aircraft codes between 115-OA and 115-OZ (in replacement of the original 5-Ox code), 115-Yx and 115-Kx (Those Mirage came from the EC 1/12 Cambrésis and EC 2/12 Picardie).

== History ==
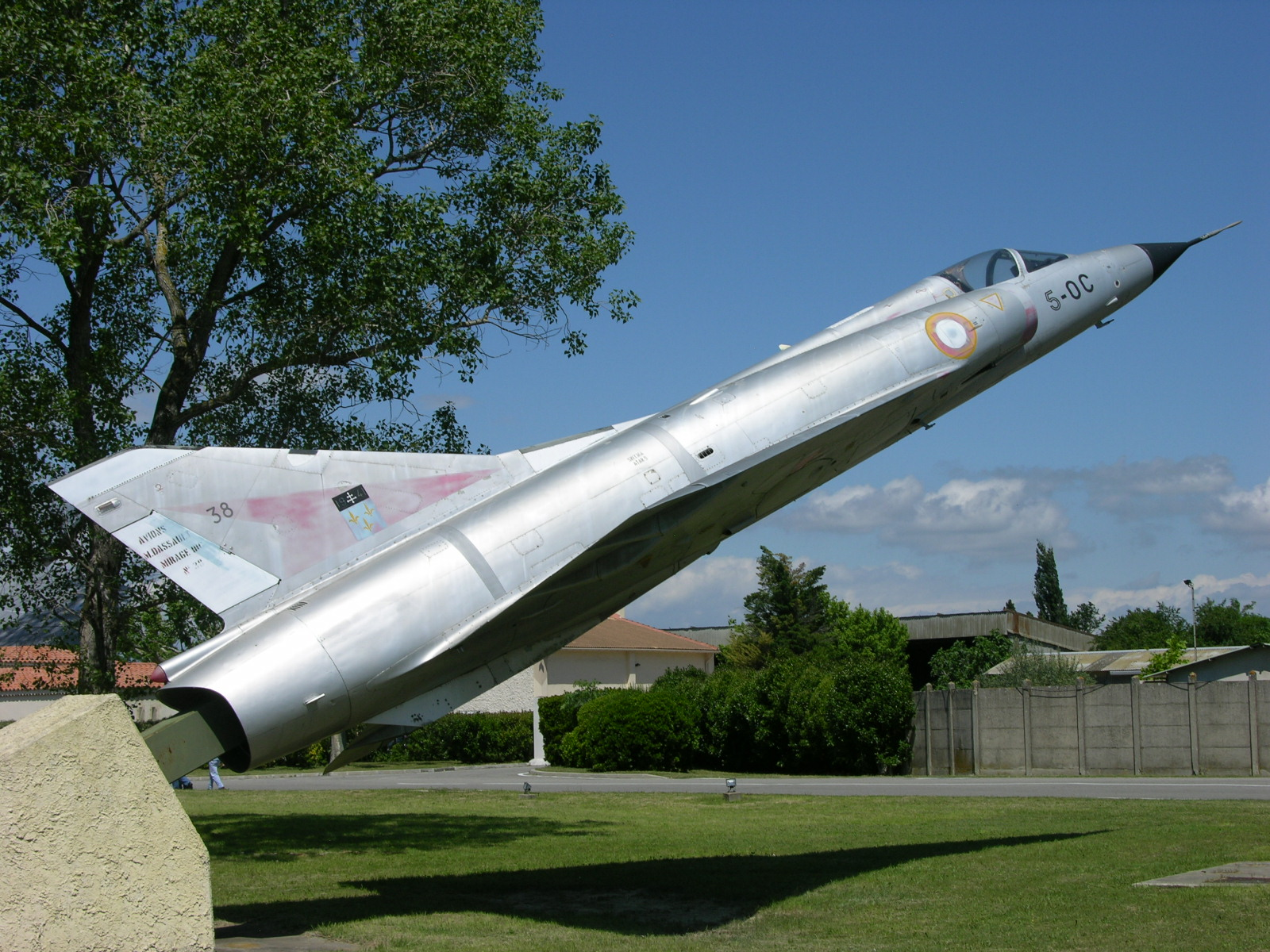
Mirage IIIC conserved at BA 115 with colors of the 2/5.

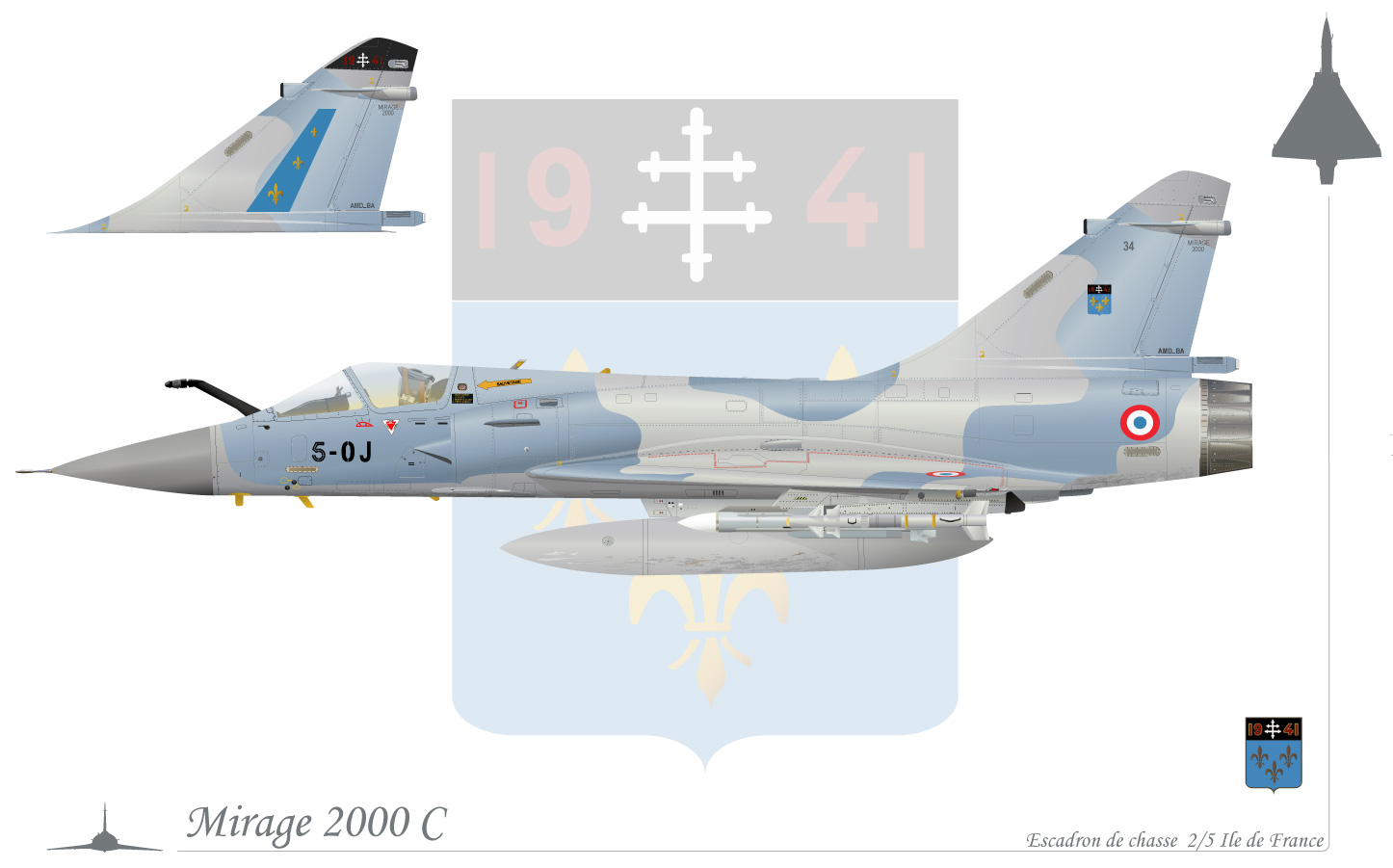
Mirage 2000 C "escadron Ile de France".

EC 2/5 carries on the traditions of a fighter squadron created by Charles de Gaulle on November 7, 1941 as 340 (Free French) Squadron of the Royal Air Force. The success of this squadron during World War II earned it numerous awards and citations.

The squadron was integrated into the 5th Wing in May 1946 and the equipped with the Bell P-63 Kingcobra. From July 1949 to January 1951, it returned to combat when deployed during the Indochina War.

In March 1951, the unit was redesignated Fighter Squadron 2/5 Ile-de-France and it moved to BA 115 Orange-Caritat and transitioned to the de Havilland Vampire. At this point the unit's history closely follows that of the other squadron based in Orange, Escadron de Chasse 1/5 Vendée. Both units received the same aircraft types a few months apart and were assigned to the same operational deployments one after the other. In September 1992, EC 2/5 Ile-de-France earned the distinction of being the first unit of the French Air Force to be deployed in Saudi Arabia to enforce the no-fly zone imposed in Iraq. It has participated in similar operations in Bosnia.

Since 1998, EC 2/5 Ile-de-France is responsible for training and operational transformation of all Mirage 2000 pilots, (replacing the EC 2/2 Côte d'Or) though its main mission remains air defense. For this, it is equipped with 17 two-seat Mirage 2000B aircraft.

The first French female fighter pilot, Caroline Aigle, served with the squadron in 2000.

On 11 June 2010, EC 2/5 Ile-de-France and EC 1/12 Cambrésis were deployed to Chad to replace the last remaining Dassault Mirage F1 aircraft of the French Air Force on the African continent.

The squadron has provided a pair of Mirage 2000C aircraft and support personnel which have been deployed to the Polish 22nd Air Base along with a pair of Mirage 2000-5 aircraft from Escadron de Chasse 1/2 Cigognes. The aircraft arrived in Poland on 2 June 2014 to relieve four French Dassault Rafales as part of NATO's response to Russian aggression in Ukraine. They were tasked with air defense and reconnaissance in Baltic and Eastern European regions.

In June 2022, the squadron was disbanded with the retirement of Mirage 2000C from this unit, it is (possibly) scheduled to be reactivated in 2028 with Dassault Rafale as RAF 6.

== Citations ==
- Croix de guerre 1939–1945 with five bronze palms for citations in the Order of the Day:
  - 4 July 1942
  - 30 September 1942
  - 12 December 1944 (No. 235)
  - 17 July 1945 (No. 941)
  - 27 December 1945 (No. 1435)
- Croix de guerre des théâtres d'opérations extérieures with four bronze palms for citations in the Order of the Day:
  - 23 July 1950
  - 2 July 1951
  - 21 June 1951
  - 10 May 1991

== Flights ==
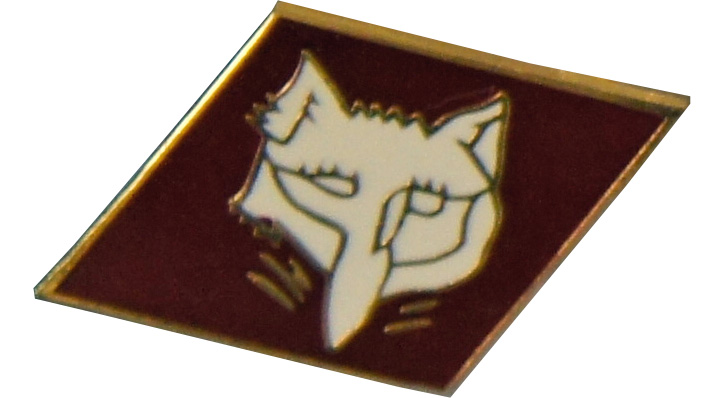
insignia of SPA84 "Tête de Renard" (Fox Head) .

- 1st Flight "Paris" to June 2012, then C46 "Trident"
- 2nd Flight "Vincennes" to June 2012, then SPA84 "Tete de Renard"
- 3rd Flight "Versailles" from 1998 to August 2008, then SPA125 "Jeanne D'Arc"

== Aircraft used ==
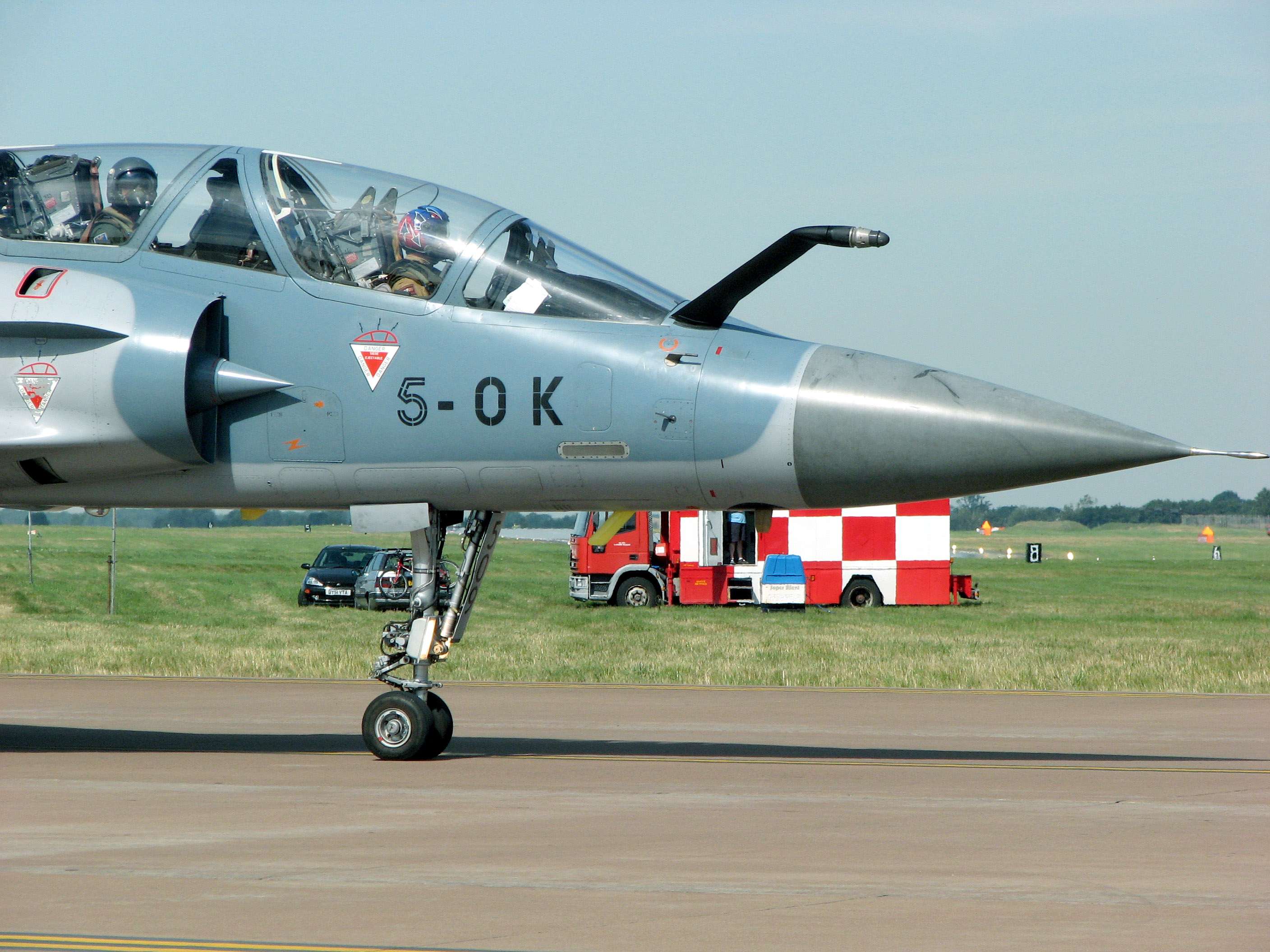
One of the 17 Mirage 2000B of EC 2/5.

- 1942-1945: Supermarine Spitfire (as No. 340 Squadron RAF)
- 1946-1951: Bell P-63 Kingcobra
- 1951-1954: de Havilland Vampire
- 1954-1956: SNCASE Mistral
- 1957: Dassault Mystère II
- 1957-1960: Dassault Mystère IV
- 1961-1966: Dassault Super Mystère B2
- 1966-1975: Dassault Mirage IIIC
- 1975-1989: Dassault Mirage F1C
- 1989–2022: Dassault Mirage 2000B/C

== See also ==
- List of French Air and Space Force aircraft squadrons
