= No. 340 Squadron RAF =

No. 340 (GC IV/2 Île-de-France) Squadron RAF
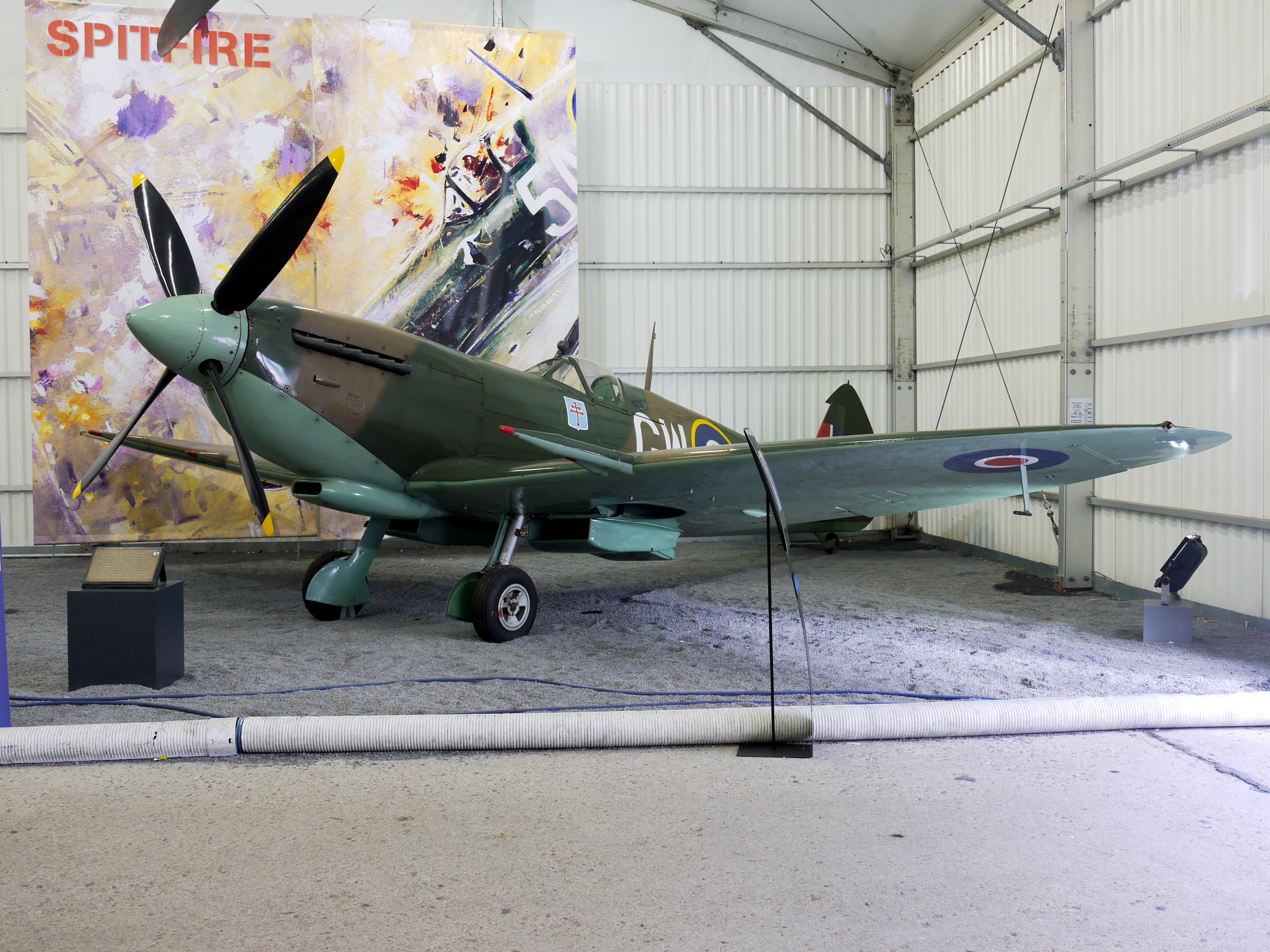
- Free French RAF Squadron 340 (GC Île-de-France) Supermarine Spitfire bearing the Cross of Lorraine marking in the Paris Le Bourget museum
- Country: United Kingdom
- Allegiance: Free France
- Nickname(s): GC IV/2 Île-de-France

No. 340 (Free French) Squadron RAF was formed at RAF Turnhouse in Scotland on 7 November 1941 with the french title: Groupe de Chasse IV/2 (Fighter Squadron 4-2) "Île-de-France". The squadron was first equipped with Supermarine Spitfire Mk I fighters and consisted of two flights - A Flight ("Paris") and B Flight ("Versailles").

== History ==
Becoming operational on 29 November with the operational code 'GW', the squadron flew defensive patrols until moving south in April 1942 to begin fighter sweeps over northern France. Between 1 April and 8 April 1942, the squadron was based at RAF Redhill near Gatwick and between 27 July 1942 and 20 March 1943, at RAF Biggin Hill.

In March 1943, the squadron was withdrawn for rest and returned to Scotland. It moved to south-west England in November for fighter sweeps and anti-shipping operations off Brittany. Joining 145 Wing of the Second Tactical Air Force (2 TAF) in April 1944, 340 Squadron helped to provide fighter cover for the Normandy landings, then moved to France that August.

After moving forward to Belgium in September 1944, the squadron returned to the UK to fly bomber escort missions and was based at Biggin Hill again between 3 November and 19 November 1944. In February 1945, the squadron rejoined 2 TAF in the Netherlands and for the rest of the war flew fighter sweeps over Germany. After a short period with the occupation forces, 340 was transferred to the control of the Armée de l'Air (French Air Force) on 25 November 1945.

During the war years, 340 flew 7,845 sorties and over 10,000 flight hours. It claimed 37 enemy aircraft destroyed with 5 more 'probables' and over 500 vehicles and locomotives. Thirty of its pilots were killed and 6 became prisoners of war. Many more were injured, some seriously.

For its gallant actions, 340 Squadron was awarded the French Croix de la Libération. This was awarded to the heroes of the liberation of France and is an exception honour, second only to the Légion d'honneur. Only 18 were awarded to French military units. In addition to the unit award, 19 squadron members were appointed to the order with the title Compagnon de la Liberation. Other awards included one Médaille militaire, four Citations à l'Ordre de l'Armée and one Citation à l'Ordre des FAFL.

In the years since the war, the squadron has become French Air Force Escadron de Chasse 2/5 Île-de-France. Over the years, it has been equipped with the Bell P-63 Kingcobra, de Havilland Vampire F.1, de Havilland Vampire FB.5, SNCASE Mistral, Dassault Mystère II, Dassault Mystère IV, Dassault Super Mystère B2, Mirage IIIC, Dassault Mirage F1C and finally the Dassault Mirage 2000. The squadron is now based at Orange-Caritat Air Base in southern France and is the Mirage 2000 operational conversion unit.
