= XOG =

XOG or xog may refer to:

- XOG, the IATA code of the Orange-Caritat Air Base in France
- xog, the ISO 639 code of the Soga language of Uganda
