= La Musique de l'Air =

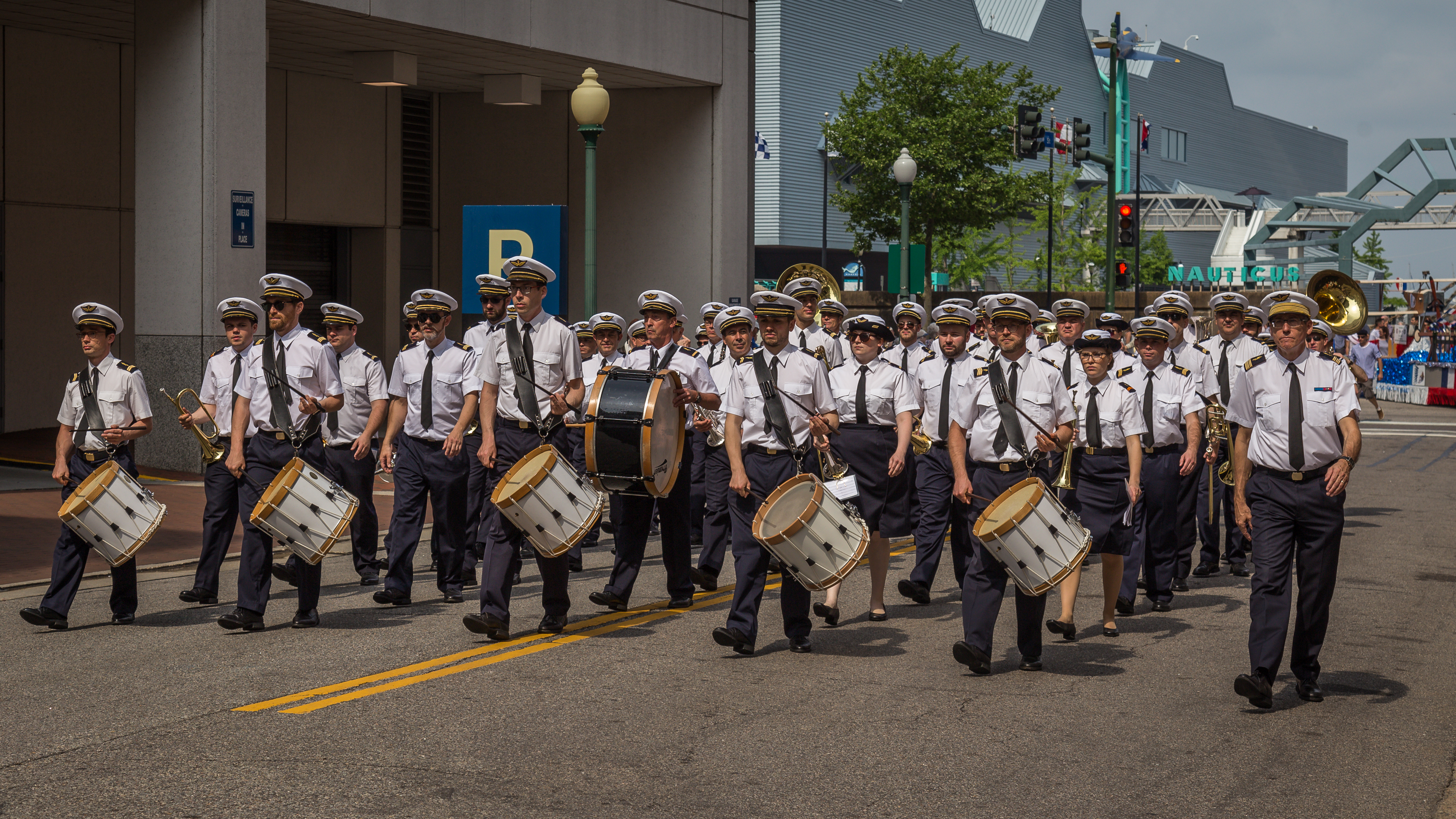
The band at the Norfolk NATO Festival's 64th annual Parade of Nations.

La Musique de l'Air (lit. 'The Music of the Air') is a ceremonial military unit in the French Air Force. Classified as a military band, it provides ceremonial music to all events supported by this service branch. The band is located at Air Base 107 in Villacoublay, in the Île-de-France. Since its creation in 1936, it has established itself as the senior band of the air force, serving ahead of the Air Forces Command Band.

== Composition ==
Ranked among the most prestigious musical groups in the French Armed Forces, the band is made up of 100 musicians, all of whom are alumni of the Conservatoire de Paris or Lyon. These musicians compose different types of formations: a wind orchestra, historical unit, the brass band, the fanfare band, as well as the jazz ensemble. A big band was created in 2005.

== Performances ==
The band regularly takes part in the ceremonies given to the highest authorities of state or to foreign people who are of importance. During the national ceremony/military parade on the 14 of July (Bastille Day), the band plays a role in providing music to the marching contingents on the Champs-Élysées. It is integrated into the cultural program of the local Army Museum and is associated with educational projects for young people. The venues it has performed in have included Les Invalides, the Hôtel de Brienne, the Salle Pleyel, the Théâtre des Champs-Élysées, or the Philharmonie de Paris. It has given cultural outreach performances throughout French territory and even at international venues. While visiting Norfolk, Virginia in 2017 to participate in the commemorations of the centenary of the American entry into World War I, the band took part in the Virginia International Tattoo.
