= Air Forces Command (France) =

- Commandement des Forces Aériennes
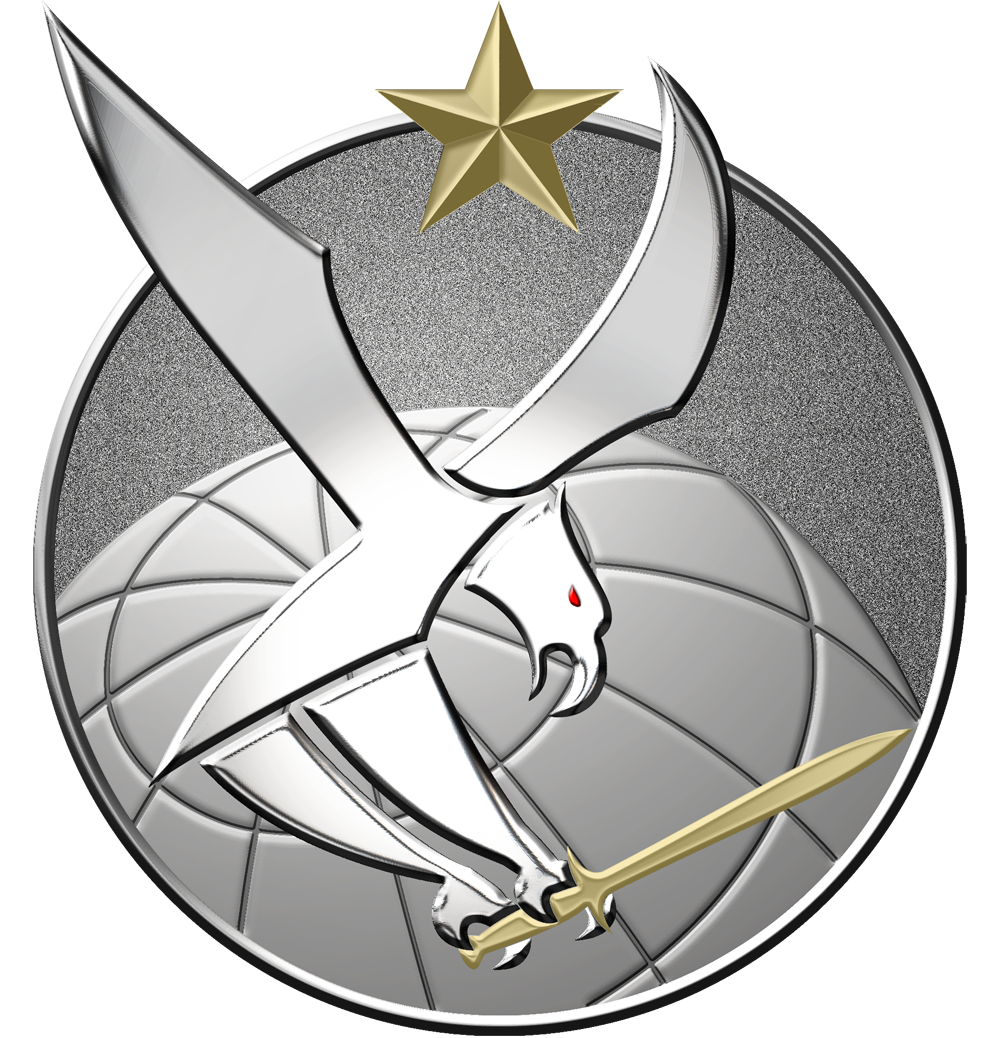
- Country: Government of France
- Branch: Armée de l'air et de l'espace
- Size: 24,000 personnel
- Garrison/HQ: Bordeaux-Mérignac Air Base

The Air Forces Command (French: Commandement des Forces Aériennes (CFA)) is a command of the French Air and Space Force. It is headquartered at Bordeaux-Mérignac Air Base.

It is an organic command (commandement organique) which prepares units to carry out their missions, but does not have an operational role itself. Since September 2013, the former organic commands CFA and the Air Force Support Command (CSFA) were merged into CFA.

== Brigades ==
CFA is organized in six brigades :

=== Fighter Brigade ===
The Fighter Brigade (French: Brigade Aérienne de l'Aviation de Chasse (BAAC)) is responsible for all air defense, air-to-ground and reconnaissance aircraft (including Dassault Rafale, Mirage 2000-5F, Mirage 2000B/D, Reaper, ALSR, ...). In February 2016 it was commanded by Brigadier General (Air) Philippe Lavigne.

Units of the brigade include:

- Escadron de Chasse 1/2 Cigognes
- Escadron de Chasse 1/3 Navarre (Nancy – Ochey Air Base (BA 133))
- Escadron de Chasse 2/3 Champagne (Nancy – Ochey Air Base (BA 133))
- Escadron de Chasse 3/3 Ardennes
- Escadron de Transformation Rafale 3/4 Aquitaine (joint Air Force / Navy unit)
- Escadron de Chasse 1/5 Vendée (BA 115 Orange-Caritat)
- Escadron de Chasse 1/7 Provence (Al Dhafra Air Base, United Arab Emirates)
- Escadron de Chasse 3/11 Corse (Djibouti–Ambouli International Airport, Djibouti)
- Escadron de chasse et d'expérimentation 1/30 Côte d'Argent
- Régiment de Chasse 2/30 Normandie-Niemen
- Escadron de Chasse 3/30 Lorraine
- Escadron de Drones 1/33 Belfort
- Escadron de Drones 2/33 Savoie
- Escadron de Transformation Opérationnelle Drones 3/33 Moselle

Fighter bases include:

- BA 116 Luxeuil - Saint-Sauveur Air Base. Air defence fighter base with 23× Mirage 2000-5F.
- BA 133 Nancy – Ochey Air Base. Three strike fighter squadrons units with 50× Mirage 2000D and 7 Mirage 2000B (EC 2/3 Champagne), SAM sqns.
- BA 115 Orange-Caritat Air Base. SEAD Escadron de Chasse 1/5 Vendée equipped with 15x Dassault Rafale B/C
- BA 118 Mont-de-Marsan Air Base. Two squadrons of Rafale B and Rafale C.

=== Projection and Support Air Force Brigade ===
This brigade (French: Brigade Aérienne d'Appui et de Projection (BAAP)), is responsible for all tactical transport and liaison aircraft (aircraft and helicopters: A400M Atlas, C-130H/H-30 Hercules, Dassault Falcon 900 , Aérospatiale SA 330 Puma, Eurocopter Fennec, Eurocopter AS332 Super Puma, SOCATA TBM).

=== Airspace Control Brigade ===
- Airspace Control Brigade (French: Brigade Aérienne de Contrôle de l'Espace (BACE)), is responsible for (Airborne early warning and control aircraft, and ground radar, ground-based air defense systems and missile defence, communication networks) airspace surveillance, constituting the Command and Executive System of Airspace Operations (French: Système de Commandement et de Conduite des Opérations Aérospatiales). Since 2007 the command, control and information systems network of the air force have been is integrated into the Joint Directorate of Infrastructure Networks and Information Systems (DIRISI)).

=== Air Force Security and Intervention Forces Brigade ===
This brigade (French: Brigade Aérienne des Forces de Sécurité et d'Intervention (BAFSI)), is responsible for units of the French Air and Space Force's commando riflemen (Fusiliers Commandos de l'Air, tasked with special operations, CSAR and target acquisition), amongst which the most elite is the Air Force Parachute Commando n° 10, C.P.A 10, unit of the French Special Forces. The BAFSI also includes the security units of the air bases (34 squadrons (of company strength) and detachments (of platoon strength)) and the rescue and firefighting personnel (called incident technicians and grouped into squadrons of company size);

=== Support brigades ===
- Air Force Aerial Weapon Systems Brigade (French: Brigade Aérienne des Systèmes d'Armes Aériens (BASAA)) provides the maintenance and repair of aerial weapons and target systems.
- Air Force Maneuver Support Brigade (French: Brigade Aérienne d'Appui à la Manœuvre Aérienne (BAAMA)) provides the ground-based engineer and logistics personnel (including expeditionary) needed for the sustainment of air operations.

These last two brigades belonged until 2013 to the Air Force Support Command (Commandement du soutien des forces aériennes, CSFA, located at Merignac), which maintained the armaments, systems, equipment, information and communication systems (CIS) as well as infrastructure; the CSFA supported the human element, the military logistics (supply and transport), wherever forces of the French Air and Space Force operated or trained. These two brigades are now subordinate to the CFA.
