= Centre d'Instruction des Equipages d'Hélicoptères 341 Colonel Alexis Santini =

Helicopter Crew Training Center 341 Colonel Alexis Santini
- Centre d'Instruction des Equipages d'Hélicoptères 341 Colonel Alexis Santini
- Country: France
- Branch: French Air and Space Force
- Type: Military helicopter
- Role: Crew Training Center
- Garrison/HQ: Orange-Caritat Air Base

Centre d'Instruction des Equipages d'Hélicoptères 341 Colonel Alexis Santini is a French Air and Space Force training unit located at Orange-Caritat Air Base, Vaucluse, France which operates the Eurocopter Fennec.

== See also ==
- List of French Air and Space Force aircraft squadrons
