= No. 329 Squadron RAF =

Royal Air Force flying squadron, manned by the French Air Force

No. 329 (GC I/2 'Cicognes') Squadron RAF
- Country: United Kingdom
- Branch: Royal Air Force
- Nickname(s): GC I/2 'Cicognes'

No. 329 Squadron RAF was a French Air Force fighter squadron, serving under Royal Air Force command during the Second World War. It incorporated the traditions and personnel of 1/2 fighter squadron Storks (Groupe de Chasse 1/2 Cigognes).

== History ==
This squadron was an amalgamation of the two flights SPA 3 and SPA 103, which had been two of the more illustrious units of the Great War. The unit also distinguished itself during the Battle of France in 1940, but was disbanded that August, following the Armistice.

The squadron was re-formed in July 1941, flying Dewoitine D.520 aircraft. In May 1942, its transfer to French North Africa (AFN) began. Following the Allied Landings in November 1942 (Operation Torch), the French ground and air forces in North-West Africa were joined with the Free French Forces. At the end of 1943, the squadron was embarked in HMS King George V, arriving at RAF Ayr, in Scotland, in early January 1944. There, on 5 January, the former groupe de chasse became 329 Squadron RAF. The squadron fuselage code of 1944-1945 was: "5A-".

After forming at Ayr, the unit moved south to Perranporth, in Cornwall, to begin equipping with Spitfire Vs. By March, these had been replaced by Mark IXs. The squadron became operational on 1 March. The squadron joined No. 145 Wing RAF, composed largely of French squadrons, of the 2nd Tactical Air Force on 14 April. It provided cover for the D Day landings in Normandy in the following June. At this stage, the commanding officer was Lieutenant-Colonel (Wing Commander) Pierre Fleurquin (1905-1971).

In August, the squadron landed in France, under the command of Capitaine (Flight Lieutenant) Jean Ozanne. Its first base in Normandy was at Sommervieu, near Bayeux. As a squadron of a tactical wing, it specialized in ground attack of troop movements, road and river supply convoys and V-weapon launch sites; however, sorties could also include air-to-air combat. Following the move forward into the Low Countries in September, the unit engageded its first jet-propelled opposition in December 1944.

In March 1945, 329 Squadron returned to the UK. It was stationed at Turnhouse, with a detachment at Skeabrae. In May 1945, it was moved to the West of England and fifteen of its aircraft took part in the Victory fly-past in Paris on 14 July 1945. It was transferred to French command, then formally disbanded as an RAF squadron, at Fairwood Common on 17 November 1945.

On the fifteenth, elements moved to Friedrichshafen, via Le Bourget, as EC 1/2 Cigognes (Fighter Squadron 1/2 "Storks"). The unit formed part of the newly reconstituted 2nd Fighter Wing of the French Air Force.

=== Aircraft ===
- February 1944 to March 1944 - Supermarine Spitfire Mk. VB.
- February 1944 to March 1944 - Supermarine Spitfire Mk. VC.
- February 1944 to March 1945 - Supermarine Spitfire Mk. IX
- April 1945 to November 1945 - Supermarine Spitfire Mk. IX
- February 1945 to April 1945 - Supermarine Spitfire Mk. XVI

Profiles of the squadron's aircraft, with its markings may be seen on the RAF web site. This shows all the squadron's aircraft with cannon as would suit a ground attack rôle.

==== Armament ====
The Mk VA mounted eight 0.303 machine guns. Mk VB had two 20 mm canon and four 0.303" machine guns. The Mk VC had a universal wing capable of mounting eight 0.303" machine guns or two 20 mm canon and four machine guns. As well as these options, the VC could carry two 250-pound (110 kg) bombs. In addition, all three had a centre-line rack for carrying either a 500-pound (230 kg) bomb or an external fuel tank. Each was fitted with a Merlin 45 engine: 1,440 horsepower (1,070 kW).

The Mk IX was essentially a Mk V with a more powerful engine (Merlin 61) and the low-level versions had clipped wings. Likewise, the Mk XVI had a more powerful engine still (Packard Merlin 266: 1,705 hp (1,270 kW)).
