= 2e Escadre de Chasse =

2^{e} Escadre de Chasse 2nd Hunter Escadre
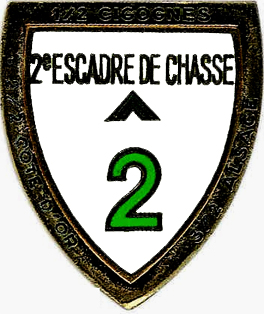
- Insignia of the Escadre
- Active: September 3, 2015 - present
- Country: France
- Branch: French Air and Space Force
- Type: Fighter aircraft
- Part of: Fighter Brigade
- Equipment: Mirage 2000-5F

The 2^{e} Escadre de Chasse (2nd Fighter Wing) is a fighter formation of the Fighter Brigade of the French Air and Space Force.

After the dissolution of the 2e regiment d'aviation de chasse (2è RAC) in September 1933, SPA 3 and SPA 103 became the first and third squadrons of the 1er group of the s2nd Fighter Wing in the course of creation at Tours. EC 2 was set up at Chartres at the end of 1936. Outfitted in early 1937 with a Dewoitine D.500, the wing was reequipped with a Morane Saulnier M.S.406 (MS 406) in April 1939.

Created in November 1945 at Friedrichshafen, it was dissolved on September 9, 1994, at Dijon Air Base, then reformed on September 3, 2015, at Luxeuil Air Base.

It now comprises the Air Force's most elite fighter squadron, Escadron de Chasse 1/2 Cigognes, Escadron de Soutien Technique Aéronautique 2E.004.

== History ==
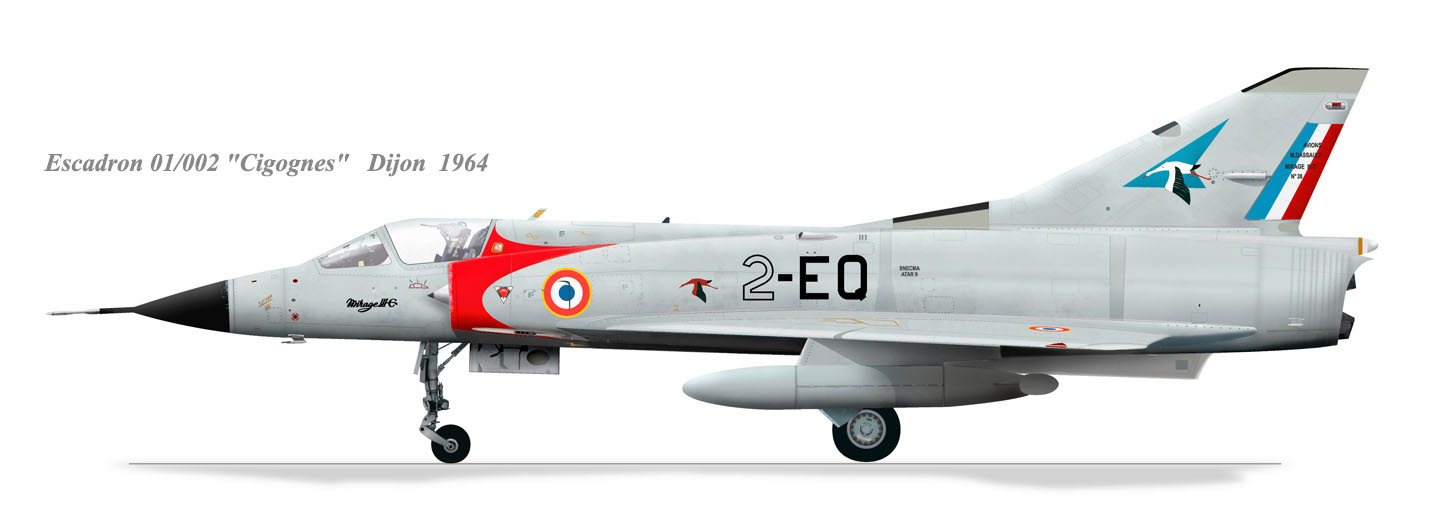
Mirage IIIC of 1/2 Cigognes.

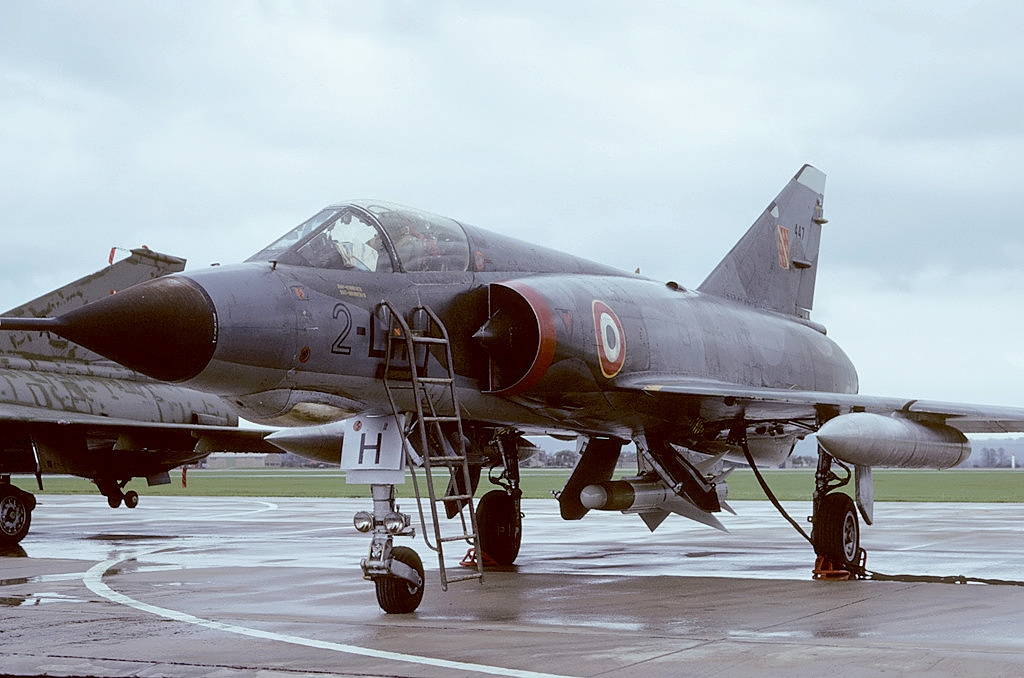
Mirage IIIE of 3/2 Alsace.

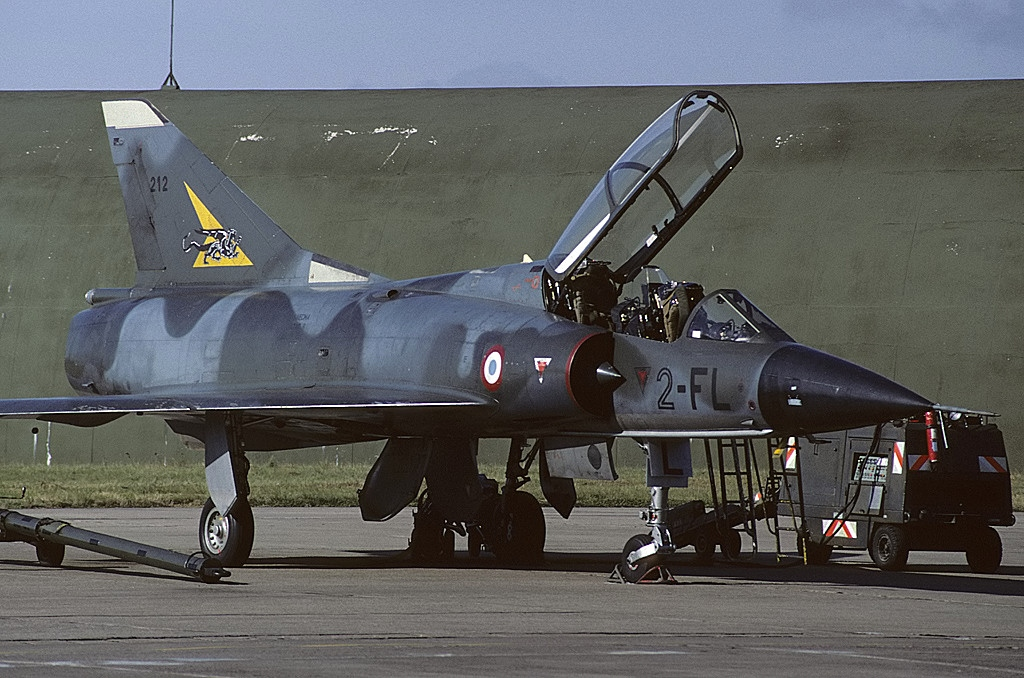
Mirage IIIB with colors of the 2/2 Côte d'Or.

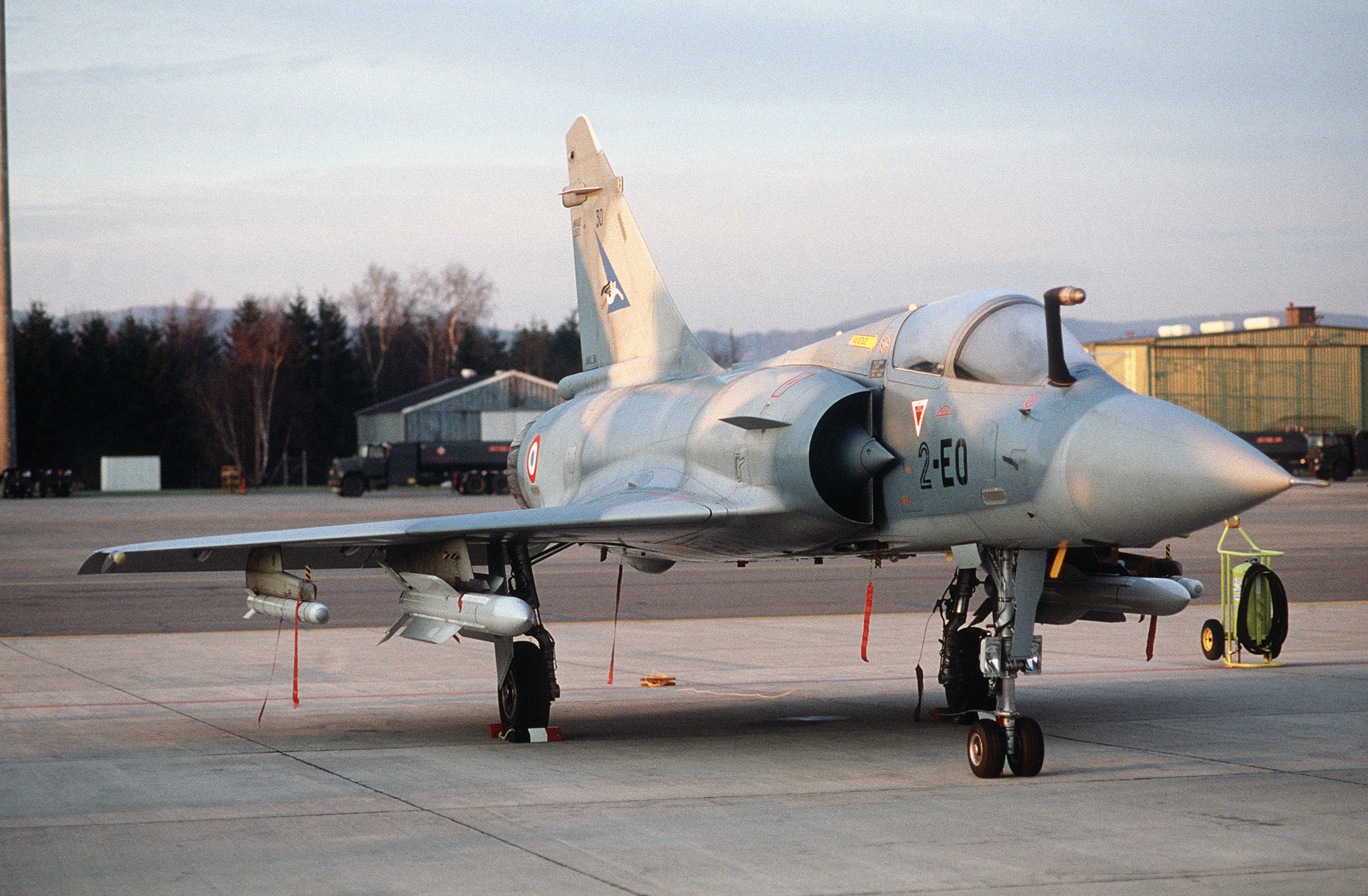
Mirage 2000C of the 1/2 Cigognes en 1987.

=== Storks ===
- Groupe de chasse 1/2 Cigognes (1 au 1)
- Escadron de chasse 1/2 Cigognes (01/10/1949 au 09/09/1994)

=== Côte d'Or ===
- Escadron de Chasse 2/2 Côte d'Or (01/05/1951 until 01/10/1957) (01/04/1965 until 01/04/1966)
- CMIR 2/102 Côte d'or (01/04/1966 until 01/11/1968)
- Escadron de Chasse et Transformation 2/2 Côte d'or (French: Escadron de chasse et de transformation 2/2 Côte d'or) (01/11/1968 until 01/08/1993)

=== Alsace ===
- Groupe de chasse 2/2 Alsace (08/11/1945 until 01/10/1949)
- Escadron de chasse 2/2 Alsace (01/10/1949 until 01/05/1951)
- Escadron de chasse 3/2 Alsace (French: Escadron de chasse 3/2 Alsace) (01/05/1951 until 09/09/1994)

=== Others ===
- Groupe de Chasse 3/2 Berry (01/11/1945 until 01/04/1946)
- Groupe de Chasse 4/2 Ile-de-France (01/11/1945 until 01/03/1946)
- Groupe de Chasse 2/18 Saintonge (01/11/1945 until 01/03/1946)
- Escadron de Chasse 3/2 Côte d'Or (01/10/1949 until 01/05/1951)
- Escadron de Chasse 4/2 Coq gaulois (01/10/1949 until 01/04/1950)

== Bases ==
- Friedrichshafen (1945-1947 until 1949)
- Hanoi (1946-1947)
- Nha Trang (1946-1947)
- Coblence (1947 until 1949)
- Aerial Base 102 Dijon-Longvic (French: Base aérienne 102 Dijon-Longvic) (1949 until 1994)
- Aerial Base 116 Luxeuil-Saint Sauveur (French: BA116 Luxeuil-Saint Sauveur) since September 3, 2015

== Equipment ==
- Spitfire Mk.IX ( 1945 until 1947)
- P-47 D Thunderbolt (1948)
- Vampire FB.5 (1948 until 1954)
- Dassault MD-450 Ouragan (1953 until 1955)
- North American T-6G (1956 until 1962)
- Dassault Mystère IVA (1956 until 1961)
- Dassault Mirage IIIC (1961 until 1975)
- Dassault Mirage IIIB (1962 until 1986)
- Dassault Mirage IIIE (1968 until 1985)
- Dassault Mirage IIIBE (1971 until 1986)
- Dassault Mirage IIIR (1983 until 1986)
- Dassault Mirage 2000C (1984 until 1994)
- Dassault Mirage 2000B (1984 until 1994)
- Dassault Mirage 2000-5F (as of 2015)

== See also ==
- Major (France)
- Chief of Staff of the French Air Force
- Frédéric Geille
- List of Escadres of the French Air Force
