= Escadron de Chasse 3/11 Corse =

Fighter Squadron 3/11 Corsica
- Escadron de Chasse 3/11 Corse
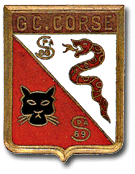
- Squadron insgnia
- Active: August 1933 - present
- Country: France
- Branch: Armée de l'air et de l'espace
- Type: Fighter aircraft
- Role: Air Defense
- Part of: Air Forces Command
- Garrison/HQ: BA 188 Djibouti (Djibouti–Ambouli International Airport)
- Engagements: World War II; Indochina War; Suez Crisis; Algerian War; Western Sahara War; Gulf War; Bosnian War

Aircraft flown
- Fighter: Dassault Mirage 2000-5F and Mirage 2000D

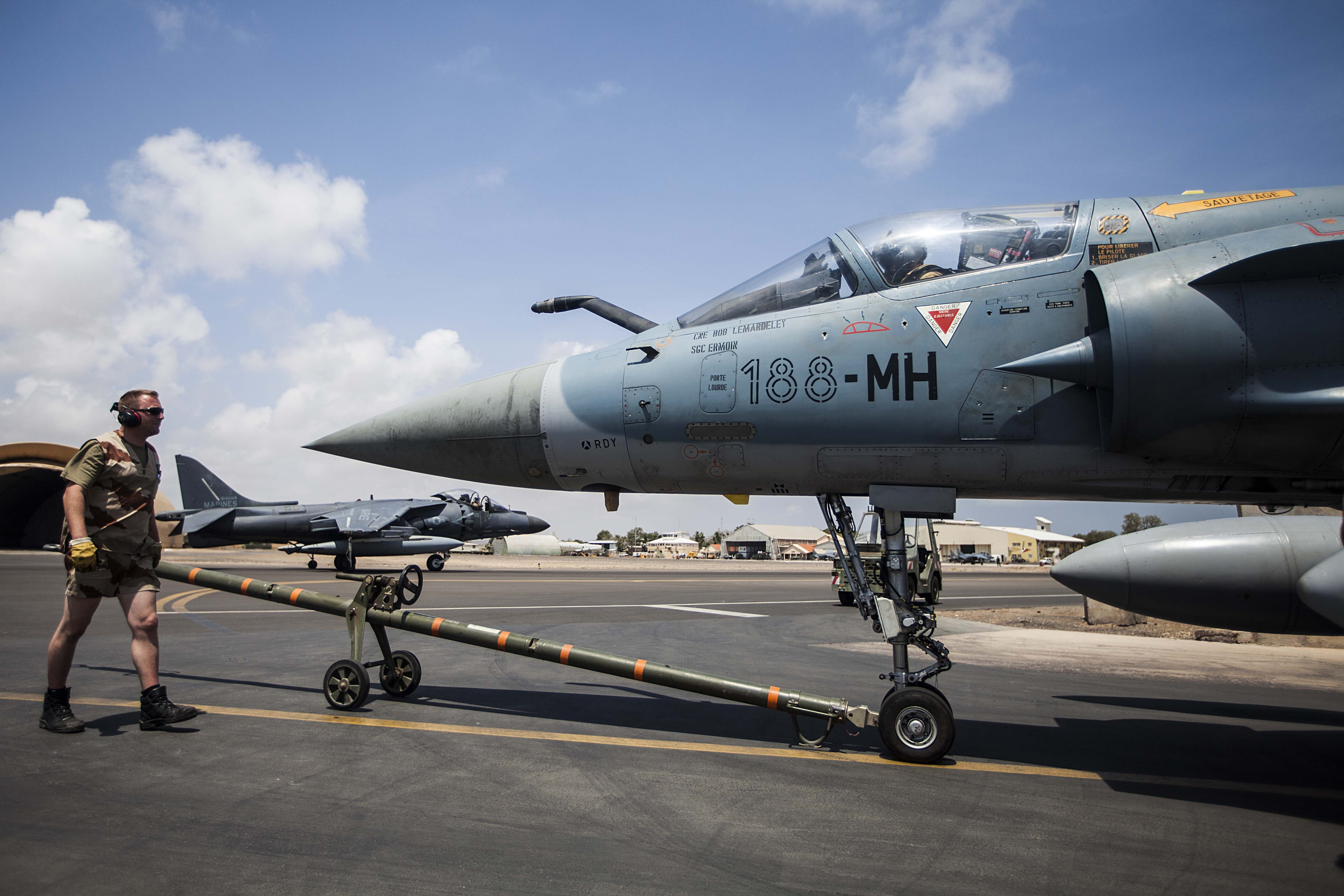
Mirage 2000-5F with 3/11 Corse at Djibouti

Escadron de Chasse (Fighter Squadron) 3/11 Corse is a French Air and Space Force (Armée de l'air et de l'espace) fighter squadron currently stationed at BA 188 Djibouti Air Base (ICAO: HDAM).

The squadron is composed of three historic escadrilles (Flights), C46, SPA 69, and SPA 88, dating back decades and with many historical traditions.

== Second World War ==
At the outbreak of the Second World War, Groupe de Chasse I/3 (GC I/3) was equipped with the Morane-Saulnier MS.406. After seeing combat during the Phoney War, GC I/3 relocated to southern France. While at Cannes-Mandelieu, the unit converted to the new Dewoitine D.520 fighter. When the Battle of France began in May 1940, it was the only unit to be operationally ready with the D.520, which it first took to battle on May 12 after hastily relocating to Wez-Thuisy. In late June 1940, as the collapse of the French armies was inevitable, GC I/3 crossed the Mediterranean to escape capture. Here it went under control of the Vichy government. After three of its pilots, including ace Marcel Albert, had defected to Gibraltar to join the Free French, the Germans requested GC I/3 to be disbanded. However, the unit was simply renamed GC III/3, using the designation of a squadron that had been disbanded the previous year. Under this guise, the unit briefly faced the Allies during Operation Torch.

After French forces in North Africa had sided with the Allies, the unit was re-christened GC 1/3 Corse and was re-equipped with Supermarine Spitfire fighters.

It then operated under the Royal Air Force, which referred to it as No. 327 (French) Squadron. No. 327 Squadron was active from 1 December 1943 until November 1945.

== Escadrilles ==
The Corse have 2 "historical" escadrille since his creation in 1933 :

- 1st Escadrille : SPA 88 'Serpent' (Snake)
- 2nd Escadrille : SPA 69 'Chat' (Cat)

2 escadrilles were also added at several moments of his history :

- Escadrille C 46 from January 1943 to July 1943
- Escadrille GC III/6 (5) from August 1994 to June 1997 (who came from the Escadron de Chasse 1/11 Roussillion)

== Differents denominations ==
- Groupe de Chasse (GC) I/3 (1933 - 1941)
- Squadron 327 (1943 - 1945)*
- Groupe de Chasse I/3 Corse (January 1943 - November 1943/ 1945 - 1949)
- Groupe de Chasse I/6 Corse (1949 - 1952)
- Escadron de Chasse (EC) 1/1 Corse (1952 - 1966)
- Escadron de Chasse 3/11 Corse (1966 - 1997/ 2008 - ...)

* In RAF Service

== Escadres ==
- 1ère Escadre de Chasse (1943 - 1945/ 1952 - 1966)
- 50ème Escadre de Chasse (1945 - 1946)
- 6ème Escadre de Chasse (1946 - 1949)
- 11ème Escadre de Chasse (1966 - 1994)

== Aircraft flown ==
- Nieuport 62 (1930 - 1936)
- Dewoitine D.500 (1936 - 1939) / Dewoitine D.501 (1937 - 1939)
- Morane-Saulnier MS.406 (1939 - 1940)
- Dewoitine D.520 (1940 - 1941)
- Supermarine Spitfire (1943 - 1945)
- De Havilland Mosquito (1945 - 1952)
- Grumman F6F Hellcat (1949 - 1952)
- Republic F-84 Thunderjet (1952 - 1956) / F-84F Thunderstreak (1956 - 1966)
- North American F-100 Super Sabre (1966 - 1975)
- SEPECAT Jaguar (1975 - 1997)
- Dassault Mirage 2000C (2008 - 2011)
- Dassault Mirage 2000D (2008 - 2016/ 2025 - ...)
- Dassault Mirage 2000-5F (2011 - ...)

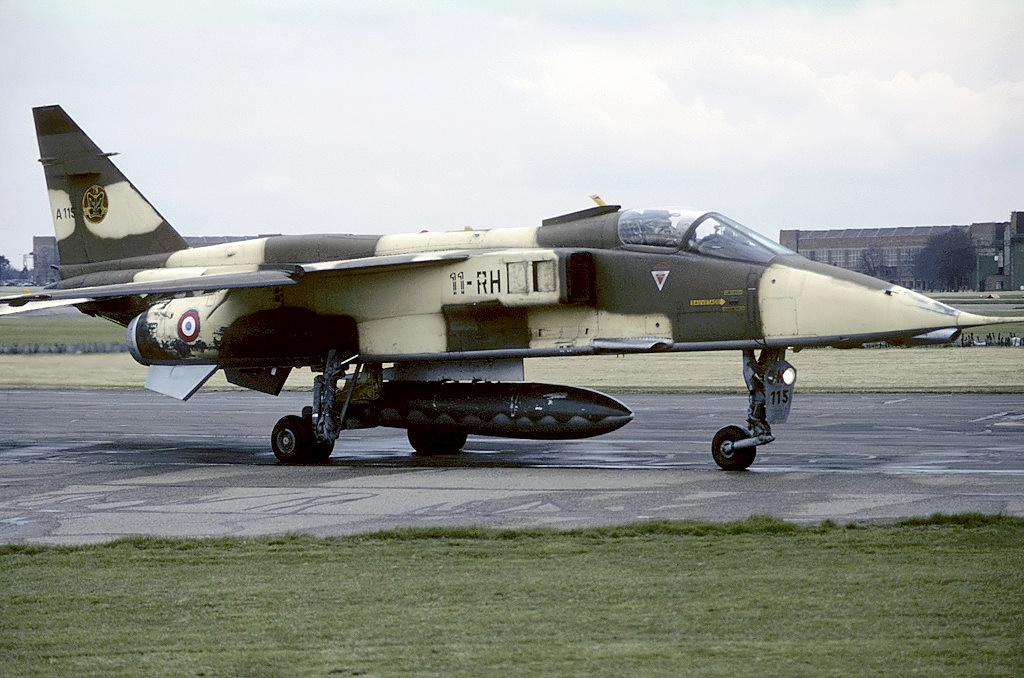
Jaguar with colors of 3/11 in 1986.

== See also ==
- List of French Air and Space Force aircraft squadrons
