= Escadron de Chasse 1/2 Cigognes =

Fighter Squadron 1/2 Cigognes
- Escadron de Chasse 1/2 Cigognes
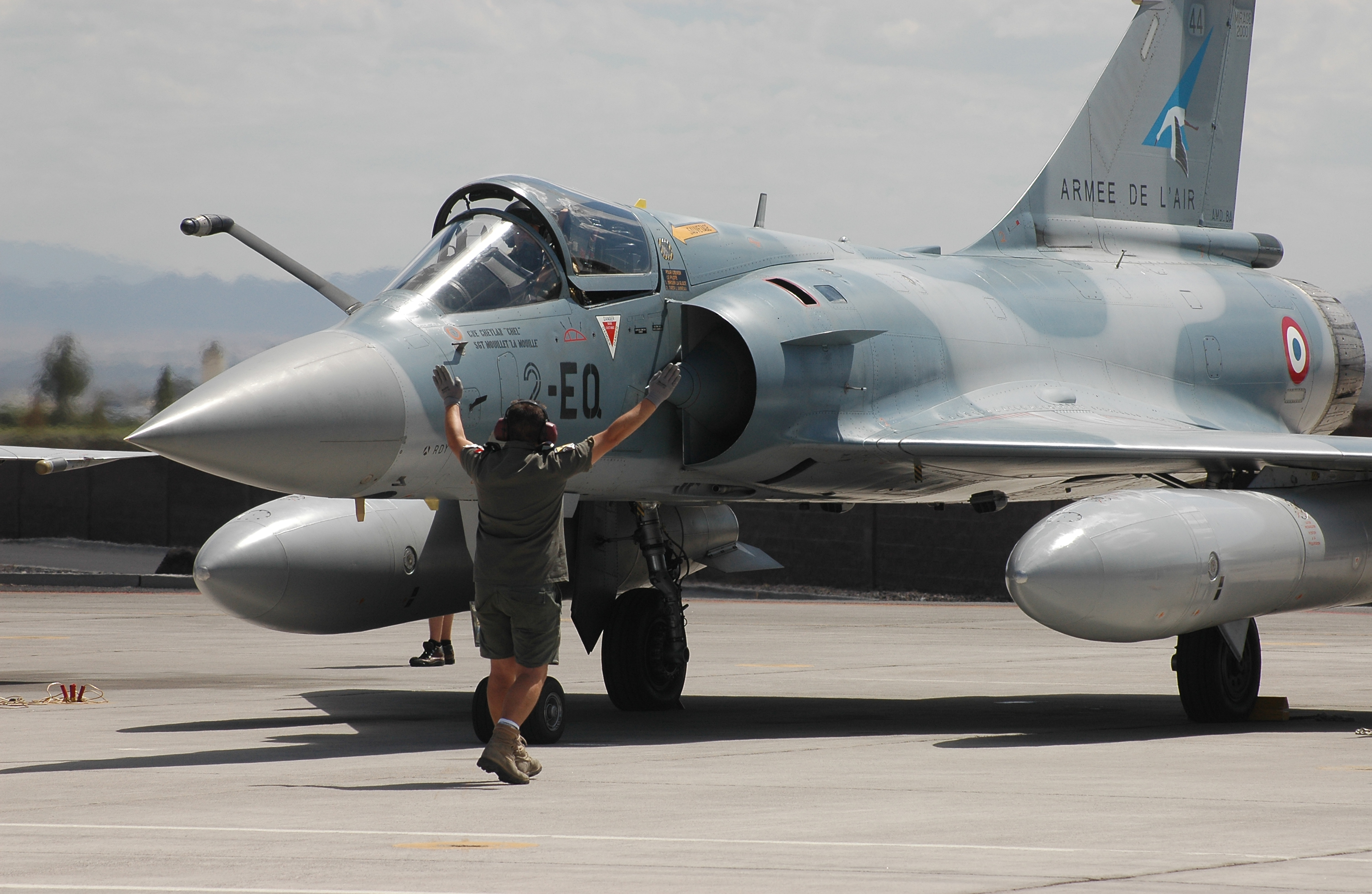
- Dassault Mirage 2000-5F of the 1/2 seen during exercise Red Flag at Nellis AFB.
- Active: November 1945 - present
- Country: France
- Branch: Armée de l'air et de l'espace
- Type: Fighter aircraft
- Role: Air Defense
- Part of: 2^{e} Escadre de Chasse
- Garrison/HQ: BA 116 Luxeuil - Saint-Sauveur Air Base

Aircraft flown
- Fighter: Dassault Mirage 2000-5F

Escadron de Chasse 1/2 Cigognes (Fighter Squadron 1/2 Cigognes) is a French Air and Space Force (Armée de l'air et de l'espace) fighter squadron currently stationed at BA 116 Luxeuil - Saint-Sauveur Air Base, Haute-Saône, France (ICAO: LFSX).

It inherits the traditions of three notable World War I units: SPA 3 of the famous ace Georges Guynemer, SPA 26, SPA 103 of René Fonck, and SPA 12.

Heir to Escadrille 3 (the "Cigognes" Escadrille), EC 1/2 Cigognes was created in November 1945, by reorganizing No. 329 Squadron RAF, which was constituted by pilots of the Groupe de Chasse 1/2 Cigognes after the armistice of 1940. The latter was deployed to French Indochina, and flew combat missions on Supermarine Spitfires, with Escadrille SPA 3 stationed in Saigon and the SPA 103 stationed in Hanoi. Upon its return to mainland France, the squadron converted to the Republic P-47 Thunderbolt in 1948.

== History ==
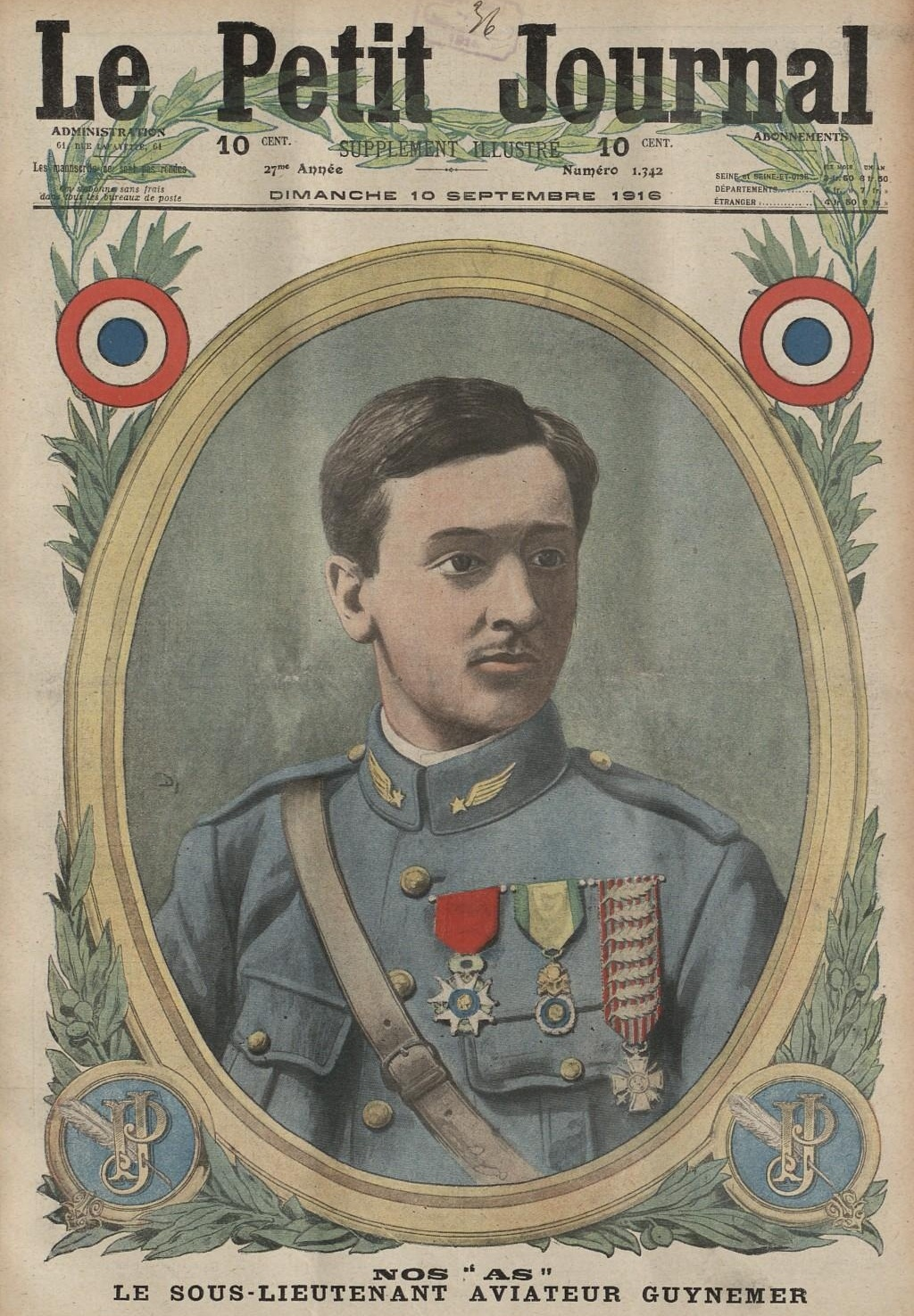
10 September 1916 cover of Le Petit Journal showing Georges Guynemer

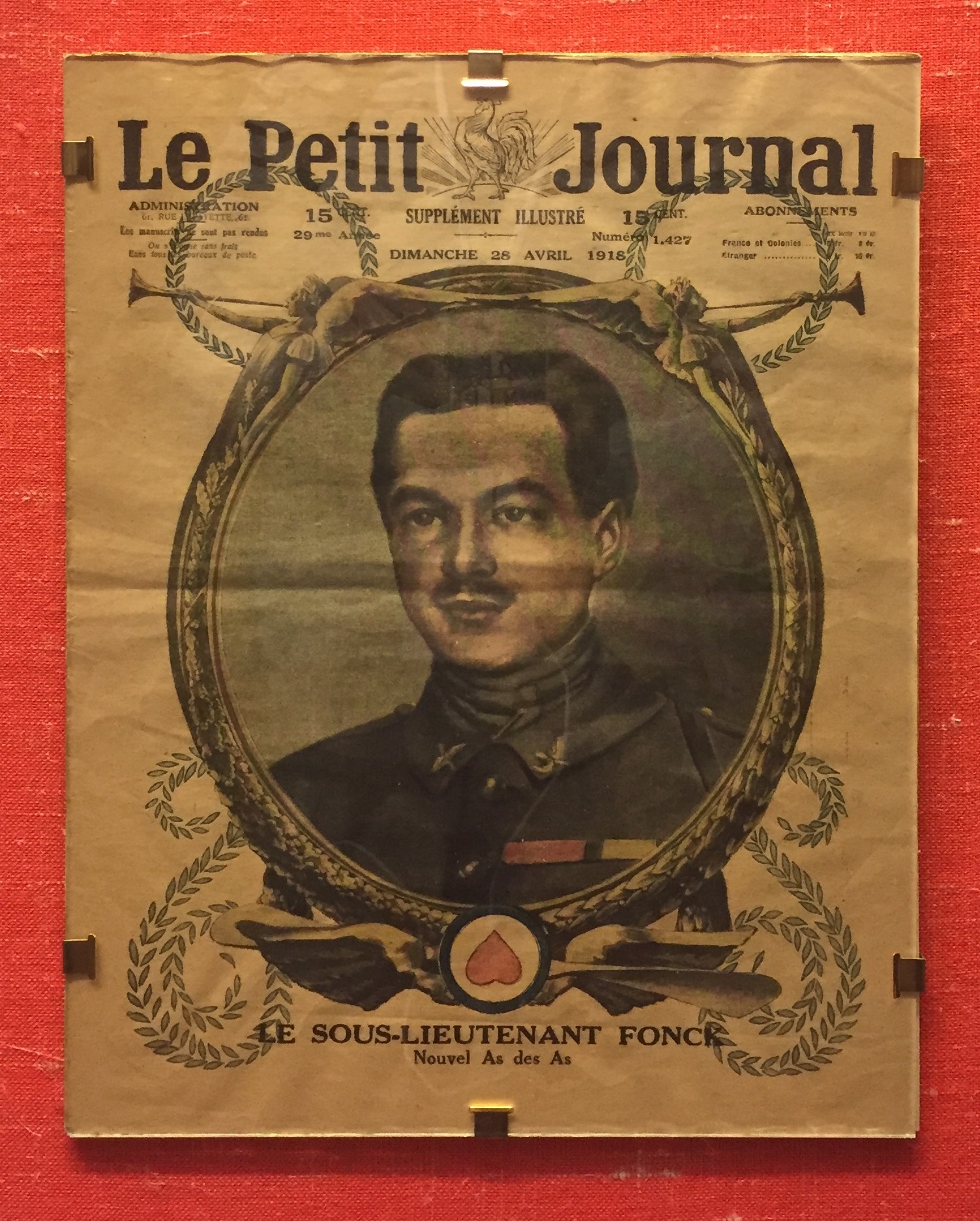
25 April 1918 cover of Le Petit Journal showing René Fonck

=== Before and during World War I ===
Following a decision taken by the French Army General Council, in June 1912, the first flights of the French air arm were formed. One of these was established at the army camp of Avord, in Cher. Its designation, BL 3, arose from the aircraft type with which it was equipped, the Blériot XI. Once established, the flight moved eastward, towards Alsace. The sight of this 'migration' led to comparison with the storks which are harbingers of spring in Alsace. So the name 'Cigogne' came to be associated in people's minds with BL 3. Alsace had been part of France until 1871 but was under German control as of 1912. The association therefore touched French pride.

It was not until 1916, under the pressure of the Great War in which aircraft numbers grew rapidly, that the association between the emblem and the unit became official. So that aircrews should be able to recognise other members of their own flight, in order to regroup after dispersal during fighting, the command of the Somme Combat Group, of which Escadrille 3 was then a part, ordered that clear symbols be painted on aircraft. By this time, the flights had been grouped into squadrons. The squadron's commanding officer, Commandant Felix Brocard, chose to make reference to the Alsatian storks by using a white stork with lowered wings as the emblem on the Nieuports of Escadrille 3. He then ordered the other flights of the squadron to choose emblems using storks in other postures. The modern emblem of the squadron bears three storks at three points in the wing-beat cycle. They represent respectively Flight 3 (wings low), Flight 103 (wings high) and Flight 12 (wings spread).

See also Escadrille 3, Escadrille 26, Escadrille 103, Escadrille 12

=== World War II ===
Having distinguished itself during the Battle of France in 1940, the squadron was disbanded in August. However, it was reformed in July 1941 and equipped with Dewoitine D.520s. In 1942, it was sent to North Africa where it took its opportunity, with other units, to join the Free French Forces and was shipped to RAF Ayr, in Scotland. There it was given the British designation No. 329 (GC I/2 'Cicognes') Squadron RAF. On 6 June 1944, it took part in the Normandy landings and from 19 August, was again based in France, at Sommervieu, Normandy, under Captain Ozanne. During this period, it specialised in ground attack but aerial combat was still part of the job and in December 1944, the squadron was faced with its first jet-propelled opposition. In July 1945, 15 aircraft of the squadron took part in the victory fly-past.

=== Post World War II ===
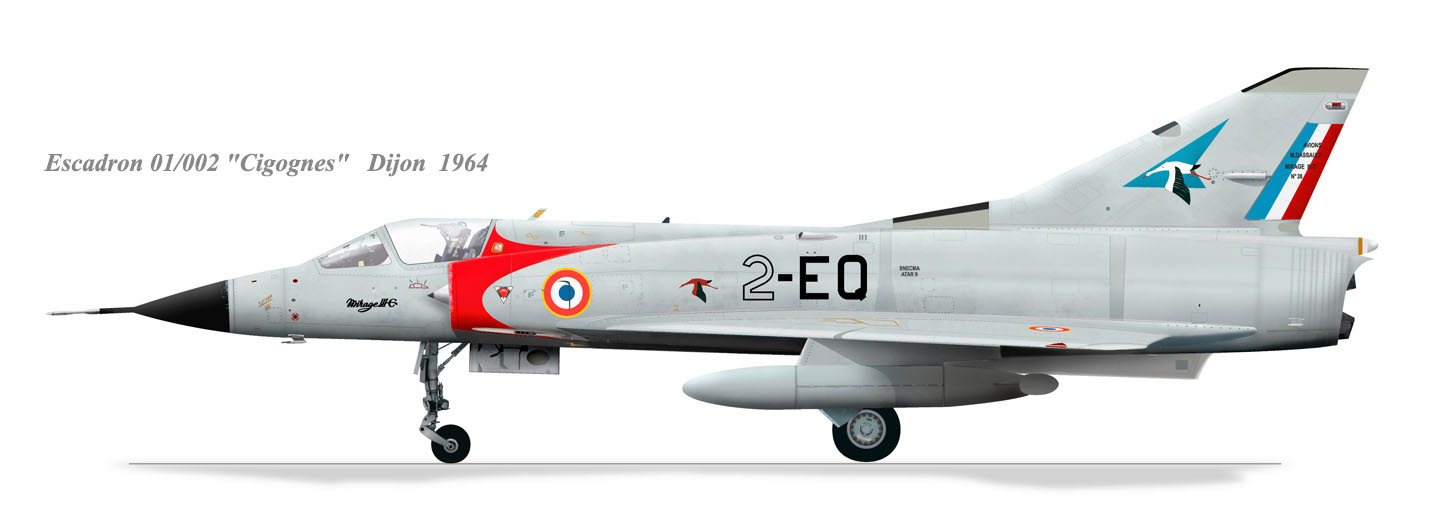
Mirage IIIC of the 1/2 Cigognes.

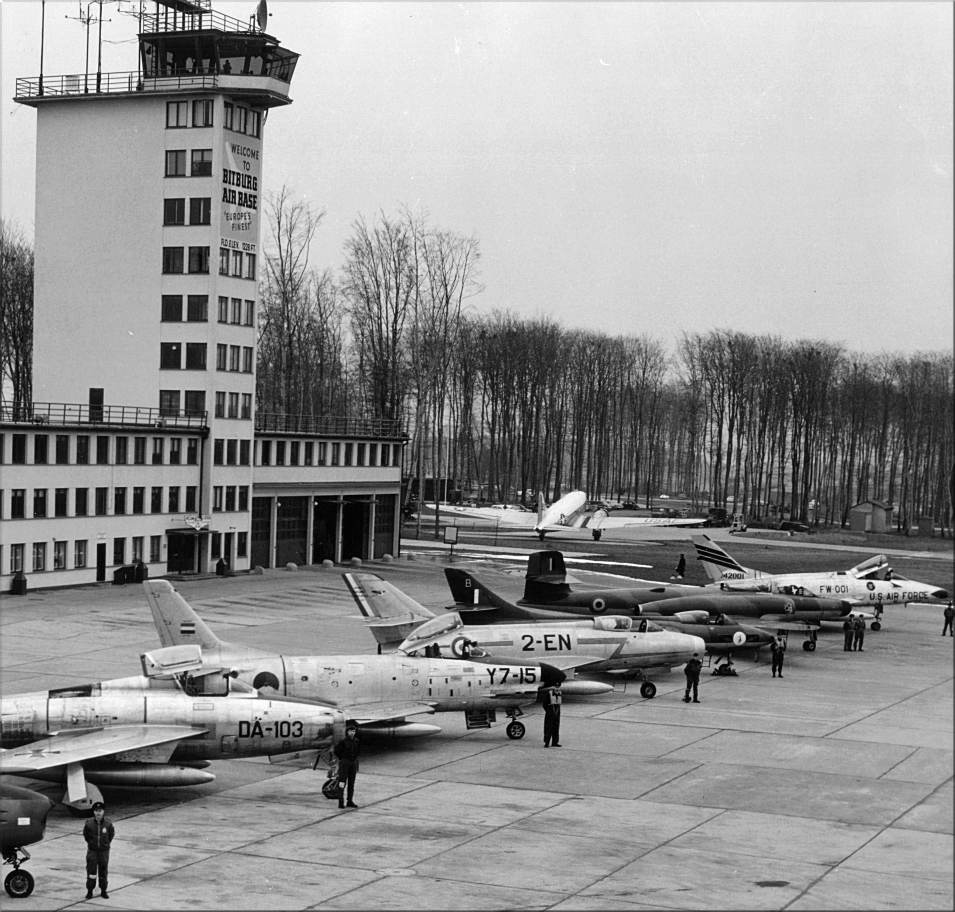
A Mystère IVA of EC 1/2 appears in this collection of NATO aircraft taken at Bitburg in 1959.

In November 1945, EC 1/2 Cigognes was re-established as a unit of the French Air Force. In June 1946 it left for French Indochina where it flew the Supermarine Spitfire, with the SPA 3 flight stationed at Saigon and SPA 103 at Hanoi. On its return to metropolitan France in 1948, it was reequipped with Republic P-47 Thunderbolts.

In 1949, EC 1/2 Cigognes moved to Dijon-Longvic, at the same time reequipping with De Havilland Vampire jets, followed by the Dassault MD 450 Ouragan, then Dassault Mystère IVAs. It was in this aircraft that the squadron was engaged during the Suez Crisis in 1956. Notably, it became the first unit of the French Air Force to deploy an indigenous Mach-2 fighter, the new Mirage IIIC, on 7 July 1961. In 1968 these were replaced by Mirage IIIEs.

In 1984, the "Storks" transitioned to the Dassault Mirage 2000C. On September 9, 1994, EC 1/2 received a third flight: the SPA 12. At the end of the 1990s, the squadron transitioned to Dassault Mirage 2000-5Fs.

Escadrille SPA 12 was dissolved on September 3, 2009, and replaced by SPA 26 (a traditional escadrille of Escadron de Chasse 1/5 Vendée, disbanded in 2007).

On Friday 29 July 2011, the squadron moved to Luxeuil - Saint-Sauveur Air Base. This put an end to the presence of the Cigognes on Aerial Base 102 Dijon-Longvic.

The squadron has played a role in NATO's response to the 2014 Russian military intervention in Ukraine, providing a pair of Mirage 2000-5Fs (along with a pair of Mirage 2000C fighters from EC 2/5) which arrived at Poland's 22nd Air Base on 2 June 2014.

The squadron has supported the training of Ukrainian pilots using the Mirage 2000-5F.

== Designations and successive denominations ==
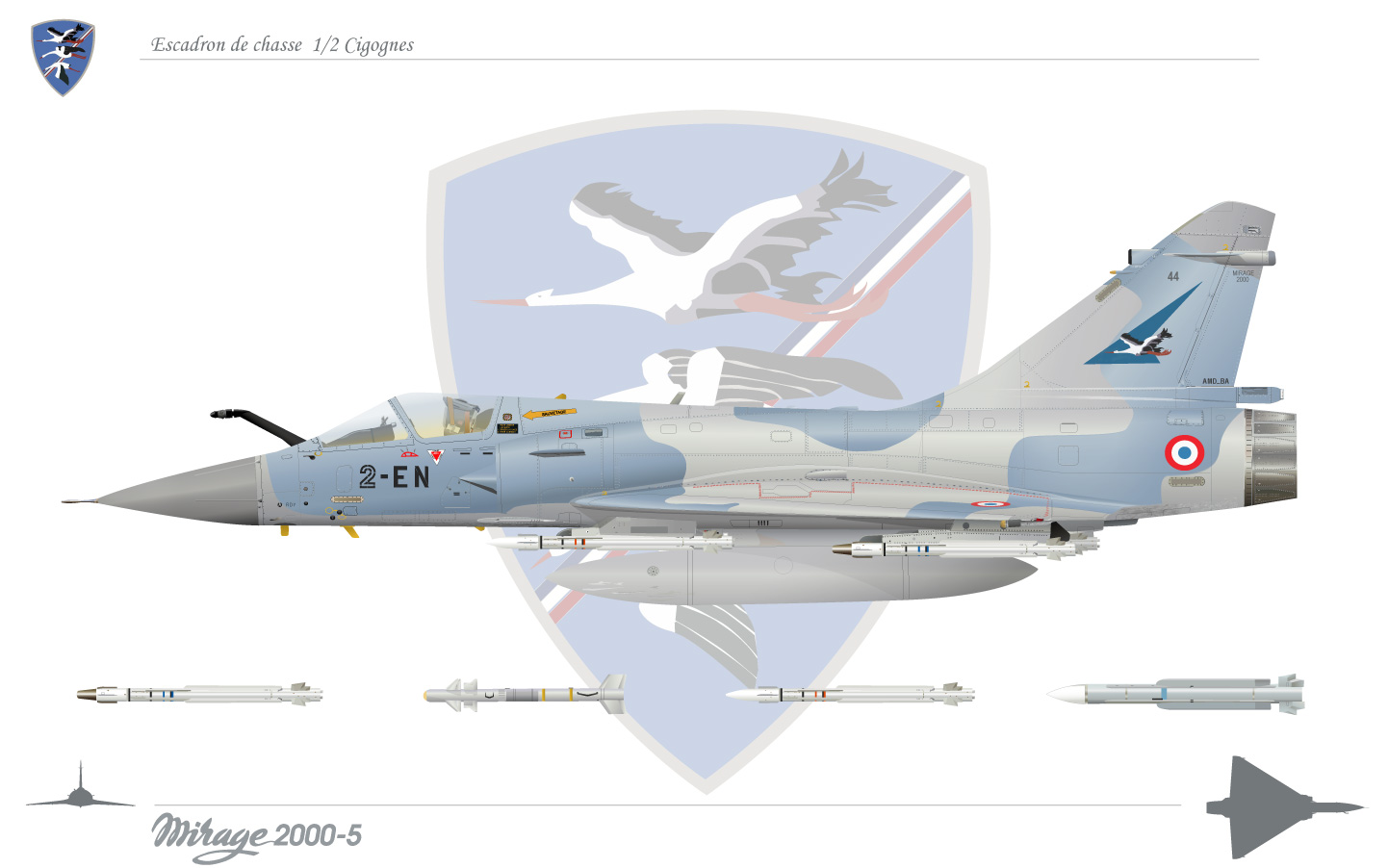
Mirage 2000 "Escadron/Squadron Cigognes".

The squadron has known during the course of history, the following designations:

- Groupe de Chasse I/2 (GC I/2) with escadrilles SPA 3 and SPA 103 from 1 September 1933 until 20 August 1940, attached to the 2^{e} Escadre de Chasse between 1 September 1933 and 1 May 1939.
- Groupe de Chasse I/2 with only one escadrille, SPA 3, from 1 July 1941 until 1 January 1944.
- No. 329 Squadron was attached to the Royal Air Force between 1 January 1944 and 1 November 1945.
- Groupe de Chasse I/2 Cigognes (GC I/2 Cigognes) with escadrille SPA 3, from 1 November 1945 until 1 April 1946, attached to the 2nd Fighter Wing.
- Escadron de Chasse 1/2 Cigognes (EC 1/2 Cigognes) with Escadrilles SPA 3 and SPA 103 from 1 April 1950 until 9 September 1994, part of the 2nd Fighter Wing.
- Escadron de Chasse 1/2 Cigognes (EC 1/2 Cigognes) with Escadrilles SPA 3, SPA 103 and SPA 12, from 9 September 1994 until 3 September 2009.
- Escadron de Chasse 1/2 Cigognes (EC 1/2 Cigognes) with Escadrilles SPA 3, SPA 103 and SPA 26 as of 3 September 2009. The Escadron/Squadron was attached again to the 2^{e} Escadre de Chasse on 3 September 2015.

=== Flights ===
As of 2015, Escadron 1/2 Cigognes was composed of three escadrilles:

- SPA 3 Cigogne de Guynemer (Guynemer's stork
- SPA 73 Cigogne Japonaise (Japanese stork)
- SPA 103 Cigogne de Fonck (Fonck's stork)

Escadrille SPA 12 Cigognes was attached to the 1/2 Cigognes between 9 September 1994 and 3 September 2009 and Escadrille SPA 26 Cigognes, known as (dite) Saint-Galmier was attached to the 1/2 Cigognes between September 3, 2009 to April 11, 2024.

== Bases ==
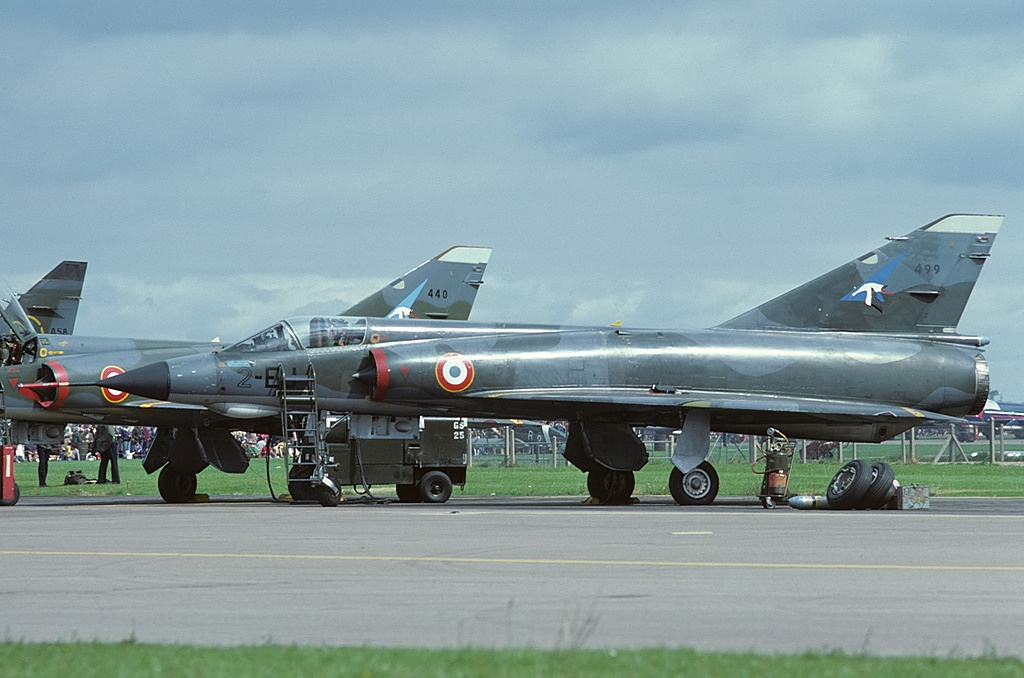
Mirage IIIEs of the squadron in 1978.

- Strasbourg
- BA 702 Avord Air Base (formation 1912)
- Châteauroux-Déols Air Base (1941–1942)
- North Africa (1942–1943)
- 1944-1945 see Free French Forces RAF service
- Koblenz (1948–1949)
- BA 102 Dijon Air Base (1949-2012)
- BA 116 Luxeuil - Saint-Sauveur Air Base (2012-)

== Aircraft ==
- Blériot XI (1912)
- Nieuport two-seaters (1912)
- Breguet (1914)
- Voisin (1914)
- Morane Saulnier (1915)
- Nieuport Scouts (1915)
- Nieuport 11 (1915)
- Nieuport 12 (ca 1915 - 1916)
- Nieuport 16 (ca 1915 - 1916)
- Nieuport 17 (ca 1915 - 1916)
- Spad VII, XIII and XXB (1917 - 1918)
- Nieuport 29 (1924-
- Spad 81 (1928-
- Nieuport 62 and 622 (1929- ?)
- [[Dewoitine D.500 | Dewoitine D.500/501]] (1937-1939)
- Morane-Saulnier MS 406 (1939-1940)
- Dewoitine D.520 (1941-1944)
- RAF service (Squadron 329) with Spitfire (1944-1945)
- Supermarine Spitfire Mk IX/ Mk XI (1945–1947)
- Republic P-47 Thunderbolt (1948)
- de Havilland Vampire (1949–1954)
- Dassault Ouragan (1953–1955)
- Dassault Mystère IVA (1956–1961)
- Dassault Mirage IIIC (1961–1975)
- Dassault Mirage IIIE (1968–1984)
- Dassault Mirage 2000C (1984–1999)
- Dassault-Dornier Alpha Jet (1998-2015)
- Dassault Mirage 2000-5F (since 1999)

== See also ==
- List of French Air and Space Force aircraft squadrons

== Bibliography ==
- Coste, Alain & Bernard, Philippe (April 2002). "Courrier des Lecteurs" [Readers' Letters]. Avions: Toute l'Aéronautique et son histoire (in French) (109): 2–3. ISSN 1243-8650.
