= Orange-Caritat Air Base =

Orange-Caritat Air Base (BA 115) Base aérienne 115 Orange-Caritat "Capitaine de Seyne"

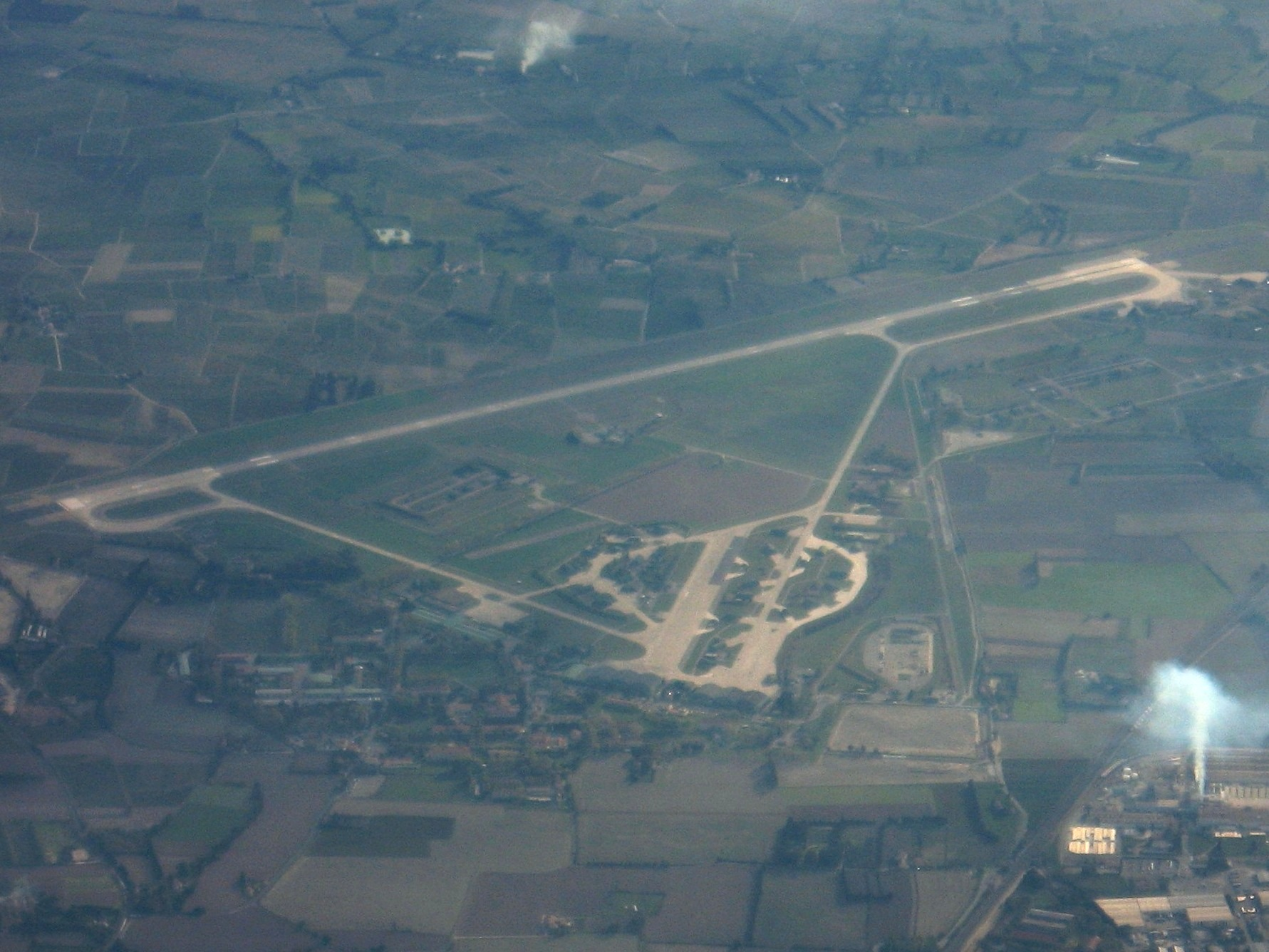
- IATA: none; ICAO: LFMO

Summary
- Airport type: Military
- Owner: Government of France
- Operator: Armée de l'air et de l'espace
- Location: Orange, Vaucluse, France
- Elevation AMSL: 197 ft / 60 m
- Coordinates: 44°08′24″N 004°52′07″E
- Website: base-aerienne-orange.com

Map
- Location in Provence-Alpes-Côte d'Azur region Provence-Alpes-Côte d’Azur in France

Runways
Direction	Length		Surface
Direction	m	ft	Surface
14/32	2,407	7,897	Concrete

Air Base 115 Orange-Caritat (French: Base aérienne 115 Orange-Caritat "Capitaine de Seyne" or BA 115, ICAO: LFMO) is a French Air and Space Force (Armée de l'air et de l'espace) base in Vaucluse, France. It is equipped with one runway and was named after Maurice de Seynes, a French-Soviet aircraft pilot. It is located 5 kilometres (3 mi) east of Orange, a commune in the Vaucluse department of the Provence-Alpes-Côte d'Azur region in France.

It hosts:

- Escadron de Chasse 1/5 Vendée - Dassault Rafale
- Escadron de Chasse 2/5 Île-de-France - Dassault Mirage 2000B
- Escadron d'Hélicoptères 1/65 Alpilles - Eurocopter Fennec
- Centre d'Instruction des Equipages d'Hélicoptères 341 Colonel Alexis Santini - Fennec
- a permanent Dépôt atelier munitions spécialisées detachment; this is a headquarters unit responsible for all special ammunition storage in France.
- escadron de défense sol-air 10.950 the base air defense unit.
- etablissement logistique du commissariat de l’air de Portes-les –valence, a logistic unit.
- a guard detachment Fusiliers Commandos de l'Air responsible for ground defense and base security.
