= Escadron de Chasse 1/5 Vendée =

Fighter Squadron 1/5 Vendée
- Escadron de Chasse 1/5 Vendée
- Country: France
- Branch: Armée de l'air et de l'espace
- Type: Fighter aircraft
- Part of: 5e Escadre de Chasse
- Garrison/HQ: BA 115 Orange-Caritat Air Base

Aircraft flown
- Fighter: Dassault Rafale B/C

Escadron de Chasse 1/5 Vendée (Fighter Squadron 1/5 Vendée) is a French Air and Space Force (Armée de l'air et de l'espace) fighter squadron currently stationed at BA 115 Orange-Caritat Air Base (IATA: LFMO) which flies the Dassault Rafale B/C.

== Denominations ==
- Groupe de Chasse (GC) II/6 (1933 - 1943)
- Groupe de Chasse II/6 Travail (1943 - 1947)
- Groupe de Chasse I/5 Travail (1947 - 1949)
- Groupe de Chasse I/5 Vendée (1949 - 1951)
- Escadron de Chasse (EC) 1/5 Vendée (1951 - 2007/ 2024 - ...)

== Escadrilles ==
From 1933 to 2007, the Vendée had with 2 escadrilles, his original ones :

- 1st Escadrille : Escadrille SPA 26 "Cigognes de Saint-Galmier" (Saint-Galmier's Stork)
- 2nd Escadrille : Escadrille SPA 124 "Jeanne d'Arc" (Joan of Arc)

With another one appearing in 1997 : the C.46 "Trident".

Since April 2024 (officially July 2024), the Vendée is composed of 3 escadrilles :

- 1st Escadrille : Escadrille SPA 26 "Cigognes de Saint-Galmier"
- 2nd Escadrille : Escadrille SPA 124 "Jeanne d'Arc"
- 3rd Escadrille : Escadrille C.46 "Trident"

== Escadres ==
- 6e Escadre de Chasse (1933 - 1939)
- 5e Escadre de Chasse (1945 - 1995)
- 5e Escadre de Chasse (2024 - ...)

== Aircraft flown ==
- Nieuport 62/ Nieuport 629 (1933 - 1936)
- Loire 46 (1936 - 1938)
- Morane-Saulnier MS.406 (1936 - 1940)
- Potez 630 (1936 - ?)
- Bloch M.B 152 (05/1940 - 06/1940)
- Dewoitine D.520 (06/1940 - 01/1943)
- Bell P-39 Airacobra (08/1943 - 1945)
- Bell P-63 Kingcobra (1945 - 1950)
- De Havilland Vampire (1950 - 1954)
- SNCASE SE.535 Mistral (1954 - 1956)
- North American T-6G Texan (1956 - 1962)*
- Dassault Mystère II (1956 - 1957)
- Dassault Mystère IV (1958 - 1961)
- Dassault Super Mystère B2 (1961 -1966)
- Dassault Mirage III (1966 - 1975)
- Dassault Mirage F1 (1975 - 1988)
- Dassault Mirage 2000 (1988 - 2007)
- Dassault Rafale (2024 - ...)

== See also ==
- List of French Air and Space Force aircraft squadrons
