= 39th Airlift Squadron =

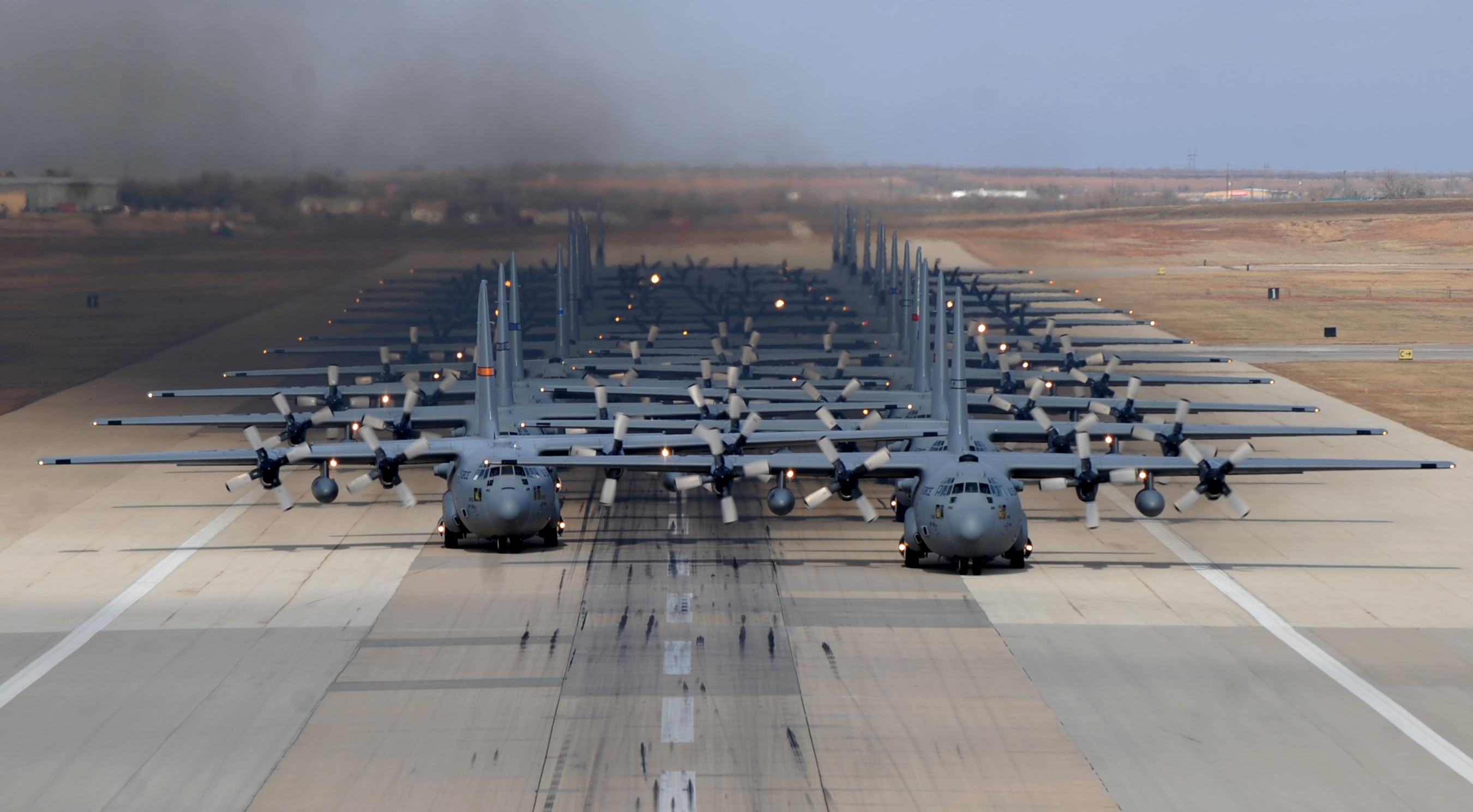
- C-130s from the squadron and the Air National Guard taxi at Dyess AFB
- Active: 1942–1949; 1952–1971; 1971–1992; 1993–present
- Country: United States
- Branch: United States Air Force
- Role: Airlift
- Part of: Air Mobility Command
- Garrison/HQ: Dyess Air Force Base
- Nicknames: Trailblazers, Jungle Skippers
- Engagements: Southwest Pacific Theater; Desert Storm; Global war on terrorism
- Decorations: Distinguished Unit Citation; Air Force Outstanding Unit Award; Philippine Presidential Unit Citation; Republic of Vietnam Gallantry Cross with Palm

Insignia
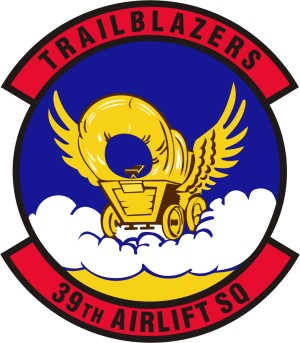
- 39th Airlift Squadron emblem (apoproved 27 October 1942)

The 39th Airlift Squadron is a United States Air Force unit based at Dyess Air Force Base, Texas. The unit flies the Lockheed C-130J Super Hercules. It is primarily tasked to transport cargo and personnel, and where circumstances require, airdrop them. It traces its history to 1942 and fought in the Pacific during the Second World War.

== History ==
The 39th conducted paratroop drops on Noemfoor, Luzon, as well as aerial transport in the Pacific Ocean theater of World War II during World War II. The squadron participated in the Berlin Airlift in 1948. It was the squadron that provided disaster relief for the Peruvian earthquake in June 1970 conducting numerous missions to the people of Peru. It was part of airlift missions to Grenada, in October 1983, to Panama, December 1989 – January 1990, and to Southwest Asia, August 1990 – March 1991.

=== Operations ===
- Operation Desert Storm
- Operation Southern Watch
- Operation Iraqi Freedom
- Operation New Dawn
- Operation Enduring Freedom

== Lineage ==
- Constituted as the 39th Transport Squadron on 2 February 1942

Activated on 22 February 1942
Redesignated 39th Troop Carrier Squadron on 4 July 1942
Redesignated 39th Troop Carrier Squadron, Heavy, on 21 May 1948
Inactivated on 14 September 1949

- Redesignated 39th Troop Carrier Squadron, Medium on 3 July 1952

Activated on 14 July 1952
Redesignated 39th Troop Carrier Squadron on 1 March 1966
Redesignated 39th Tactical Airlift Squadron on 1 May 1967
Inactivated on 31 July 1971

- Activated on 31 August 1971

Redesignated 39th Airlift Squadron on 1 January 1992
Inactivated on 1 June 1992

- Activated on 1 October 1993

=== Assignments ===
- 317th Transport Group (later 317th Troop Carrier Group), 22 February 1942 – 14 September 1949
- 317th Troop Carrier Group, 14 July 1952
- 465th Troop Carrier Wing, 12 March 1957
- 317th Troop Carrier Wing, 8 July 1957
- 322d Air Division, 25 September 1958
- 317 Troop Carrier Wing (later 317 Tactical Airlift Wing), 15 April 1963 – 31 July 1971 (attached to Detachment 1, 322d Air Division, February–May 1965; 513th Tactical Airlift Wing, 13 May–18 July 1968; 7310th Tactical Airlift Wing (15 April–22 July 1969))
- 317th Tactical Airlift Wing, 31 August 1971 (attached to 322d Tactical Airlift Wing, 12 December 1973 – 17 February 1974; 513th Tactical Airlift Wing, 9 July–15 September 1974, 12 July – 14 September 1975; 435th Tactical Airlift Wing, 12 April–14 June 1976, 1 October–15 December 1977; 435th Tactical Airlift Group, 4 January–4 March 1977)
- 317th Tactical Airlift Group, 1 October 1978 (attached to 313th Tactical Airlift Group, 5 June–14 August 1979)
- 317th Tactical Airlift Wing, 1 April 1980 (attached to 313th Tactical Airlift Group, 8 October–13 December 1980, 3 February–14 April 1982, 4 June–13 August 1983, 1 October–12 December 1984, 2 February–15 April 1986), 3 March–15 May 1987, 3 June–10 August 1988, May–11 July 1991)
- 317 Operations Group, 1 January–1 June 1992 (attached to 313th Tactical Airlift Group, 3 April–31 May 1992)
- 7th Operations Group, 1 October 1993
- 317th Airlift Group, 1 April 1997 – present

=== Stations ===
- Duncan Field, Texas, 22 February 1942
- Bowman Field, Kentucky, 9 October 1942
- Lawson Field, Georgia, October 1942
- Laurinburg-Maxton Army Air Base, North Carolina, 2–12 December 1942
- Garbutt Field, Queensland, Australia, 22 January 1942
- Archerfield Airport, Queensland, Australia, 22 February 1942
- Port Moresby Airfield Complex, New Guinea, 28 September 1943
- Finschhafen Airfield, New Guinea, 23 April 1944
- Hollandia Airfield, New Guinea, July 1944
- Leyte, Philippines, 19 November 1944
- Clark Field, Luzon, Philippines, 28 March 1945
- Okinawa, Ryuku Island, 19 August 1945
- Fukuoka Air Base, Japan, 11 November 1945
- Tachikawa Air Base, Japan, 15 January 1946
- Yamoto Air Base, Japan, 17 July 1946
- Carelus Army Air Field, Japan, 6 September 1946
- Tachikawa Air Base, Japan, 16 October 1946 – 21 September 1948
- Wiesbaden Air Base, Germany, 30 September 1948
- RAF Celle, Germany, 23 December 1948 – 14 September 1949
- Rhein-Main Air Base, Germany, Germany, 14 July 1952
- Neubiberg Air Base, Germany, 23 March 1953
- Évreux-Fauville Air Base, France, 24 June 1956 – 20 June 1964
- Lockbourne Air Force Base, Ohio, 20 June 1964 – 31 July 1971

Deployed to Évreux-Fauville Air Base, France, February–May 1965; RAF Mildenhall, England, 13 May-18 July 1968; Rhein-Main Air Base, Germany (15 April-22 July 1969)

- Pope Air Force Base, North Carolina, 31 August 1971 – 1 June 1992

Deployed to Rhein-Main Air Base, Germany, 12 December 1973 – 17 February 1974, 12 April–14 June 1976, 1 October–15 December 1977; RAF Mildenhall, England, 12 July–14 September 1975, 4 January–4 March 1977, 5 June–14 August 1979, 8 October–13 December 1980, 3 February–14 April 1982, 4 June–13 August 1983, 1 October–12 December 1984, 2 February–15 April 1986, 3 March–15 May 1987, 3 June–10 August 1988, May–11 July 1991, 3 April–31 May 1992)

- Dyess Air Force Base, Texas, 1 October 1993 – present

=== Aircraft ===
- Douglas C-47 Skytrain (1942–1946)
- Curtiss C-46 Commando (1946–1948)
- Douglas C-54 Skymaster (1946–1949)
- Fairchild C-119 Flying Boxcar (1952–1958)
- Lockheed C-130 Hercules (1958–1971, 1971 – Present)
