= 317th Operations Group =

317th Operations Group

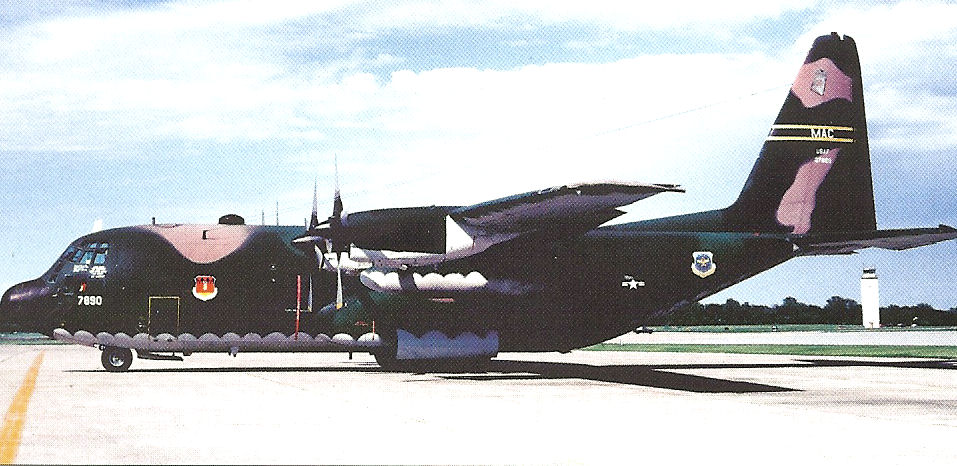
- 317th C-130E Hercules
- Active: 1942–1949; 1952–1957; 1978–1980; 1992–1993
- Country: United States
- Branch: United States Air Force
- Role: Airlift
- Part of: Air Mobility Command
- Nickname: Jungle Skippers (World War II)
- Motto: I Gain By Hazard
- Engagements: Southwest Pacific Theater
- Decorations: Distinguished Unit Citation Philippine Presidential Unit Citation

Insignia
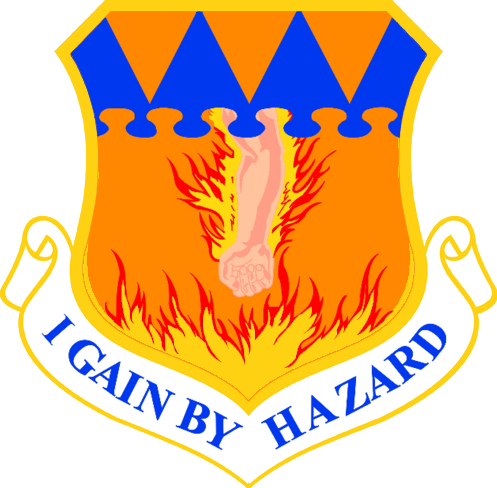
- 317th Operations Group emblem (Approved 22 December 1942)

The 317th Operations Group is an inactive United States Air Force unit, last stationed at Pope Air Force Base, North Carolina as part of Air Mobility Command. It was activated in 1992 during the Air Force's Objective Wing reorganization, and inactivated the following year when all Air Force units at Pope were assigned to the 23d Wing.

The group was first activated as the 317th Transport Group in February 1942, becoming the 317th Troop Carrier Group in July. The 317th took part in nearly all the airlift operations in the Pacific Theater of Operations, including the Battle of Wau, New Guinea, and Operation Topside, parachute drops on Corregidor in 1945. For each of these operations the 317th was awarded the Distinguished Unit Citation. Following the war, the 317th served as part of the occupation forces in Japan.

In September 1948, the group (now equipped with the Douglas C-54 Skymaster) moved to Germany to augment the Berlin Airlift forces and flew missions from Celle RAF Station until the end of the Airlift in 1949. It was inactivated in September 1949 as part of the Air Force's reduction of the number of combat groups required by President Truman's 1949 defense budget. The group returned to Germany in June 1952 as a theater airlift unit flying Fairchild C-119 Flying Boxcars. Its squadrons were attached to its parent 317th Troop Carrier Wing in 1955 and the group was inactivated in March 1957.

The group has been active twice since then, as the 317th Tactical Airlift Group from 1978 to 1980 and as the 317th Operations Group from 1992 to 1993. Forces deployed from the group participated in Operation Desert Storm in 1992.

== History ==
=== World War II ===
==== Training in the United States ====
The group was first activated at Duncan Field, Texas on 22 February 1942 as the 317th Transport Group with the 39th, 40th and 41st Transport Squadrons assigned. The group's initial cadre was eighteen enlisted men and one captain. In mid-June, the group added a fourth squadron, the 46th Transport Squadron and moved to Bowman Field, Kentucky with 83 men assigned. The group was equipped with several military models of the DC-3, primarily the Douglas C-47 Skytrain. It began training at Bowman and grew to over 900 persons.

The 317th became the 317th Troop Carrier Group in July 1942 and grew to its full wartime strength of over 1200 as it prepared to deploy. Originally scheduled for European operations, its orders were changed to prepare to move to join the South West Pacific Area. Its final training with gliders, at Laurinburg-Maxton Airport was cancelled when a storm destroyed the gliders that were to be used for training.

The air echelon of the group flew to Brookley Field, Alabama to receive new C-47s from the Mobile Air Depot. These planes were outfitted with additional internal fuel tanks, for the group was to ferry them across the Pacific. The group's aircrews flew them to the Pacific coast to practice long range navigation, while the ground echelon proceeded by train to Camp Stoneman, California, embarking on the USS Maui (ID-1514) on 31 December 1942, while the aircrews departed on the first leg of their ferry flight to Australia on 5 January 1943.

==== Combat in the Pacific ====
The 317th arrived in Australia in January 1943, where it was assigned to Fifth Air Force. The 317th was the second airlift group in the Southwest Pacific Theater. (Note: Fifth Air Force had organized the 374th Troop Carrier Group in Australia in December 1942 from squadrons already in the theater. Maurer, Combat Units, pp. 261–262.) Upon arrival in Australia, the 46th Squadron was placed under the control of the Allied Directorate of Air Transport and equipped with a Boeing B-17 Flying Fortress and a Consolidated B-24 Liberator converted for transport operations, plus several Douglas C-39s. In June 1943. the B-17 crashed with six crewmembers and 36 passengers on board in what was considered at the time the worst aviation disaster in Australia.

The group deployed to New Guinea for operations for a short time early in 1943. It received a Distinguished Unit Citation for making numerous flights in unarmed planes over the Owen Stanley Range on 30 January and 1 February 1943 to transport reinforcements and supplies to Wau, Papua New Guinea, where allied forces were defending a valuable Allied airdrome against Japanese attack.

The group exchanged its new C-47's for a variety of aircraft in New Guinea and began operating from Australia, where group headquarters were located. Many of these aircraft carried Australian civil registrations. It flew troops and equipment to New Guinea, established courier and passenger routes in Australia, and trained with airborne troops.

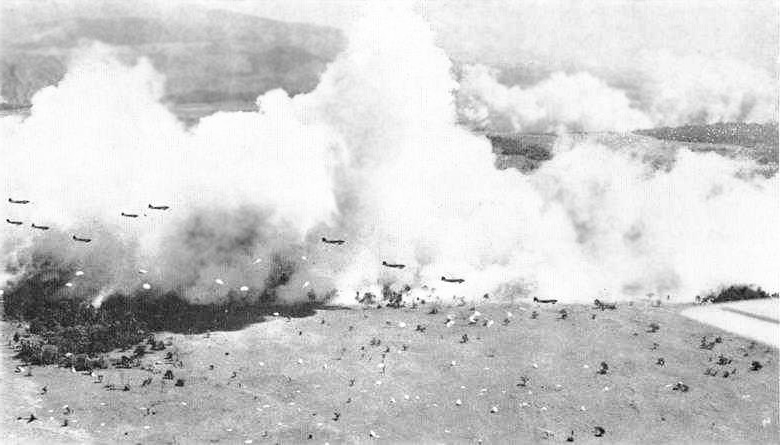
C-47s dropping paratroopers at Nadzab

The group again equipped with C-47's and left Australia for New Guinea in September 1943. It took part in the first airborne operation in the Southwest Pacific on 5 September, dropping paratroops at Nadzab, New Guinea, to cut supply lines and seize enemy bases in the area. Until November 1944, the group transported men and cargo to Allied bases on New Guinea, New Britain, Guadalcanal, and in the Admiralty Islands. It also dropped reinforcements and supplies to forces on Noemfoor on 3 and 4 July 1944.

The 317th moved to the Philippines in November 1944. There the group transported supplies to ground forces on Luzon, Leyte, and Mindoro, and supplied guerrillas on Mindanao, Cebu, and Panay. It participated in two airborne operations during February 1945. On 3 and 4 February it dropped paratroops south of Manila to seize roads leading to the city. On 16 and 17 February it dropped the 503rd Parachute Regimental Combat Team on Corregidor to open Manila Bay to US shipping. Because of the small size of the Corregidor drop zone, which bordered a 500-foot tall cliff, each plane of the group could only permit a handful of paratroopers to jump on each approach to the drop zone. Over 600 individual passes were made by the group's planes and more than half of the planes received battle damage from enemy fire. The 317th received its second Distinguished Unit Citation for this operation.

The group flew two unusual missions on 12 and 15 April 1945 when this troop carrier organization bombed Carabao Island with napalm drums. The group dropped part of 511th Parachute Infantry Regiment near Aparri on 23 June 1945 to split Japanese forces in the Cagayen Valley and prevent them from retreating to the hills in northern Luzon.

=== Army of Occupation and Berlin Airlift ===
The 317th was the first Allied unit to touch down on Japanese soil after the surrender of Japan, when twelve of its planes led a 16 ship formation that landed at Atsugi Air Base on 28 August. (Note: The other four theater airlift groups in the theater each contributed one aircraft each to the formation. Smith, p. 8.) Colonel John Lackey, commanding officer of the 317th, was the first American pilot to land in Japan. His plane, and the next two to land were equipped with special communications gear in order to establish an initial command and control network for the occupying forces.

After the end of the Pacific War, the 317th remained in the theater as part of Far East Air Forces. The group provided troop carrier and courier service in the Far East. It added Curtiss C-46 Commandos to its C-47s, then replaced the C-47s with larger four-engine Douglas C-54 Skymasters in 1947, adding "Heavy" to its name in the spring of 1948. In August 1948, with the implementation of the wing base reorganization, the group and its support organizations at Tachikawa Airfield, Japan were assigned to the new 317th Troop Carrier Wing.

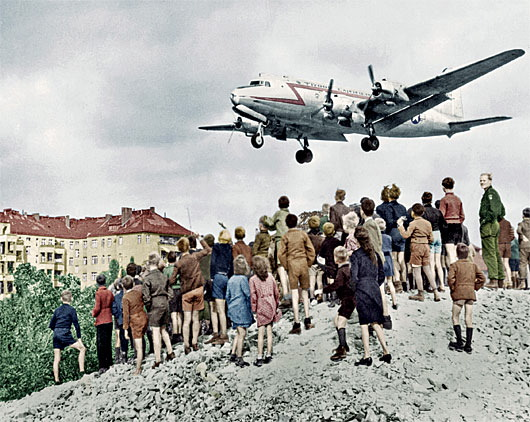
C-54 landing at Tempelhof during the Berlin Airlift

The Soviet blockade of Berlin created a demand for all the large transport aircraft in the United States Air Force inventory. Although United States Air Forces Europe had two troop carrier groups in Germany, they were both equipped with the C-47 in the summer of 1948. These aircraft were aging, had a limited capacity, presented serious supply problems associated with the parts needed to keep them flying and their payload was limited.

The group left Japan for Germany in September 1948, completing the transfer in nine days. Shortly after its arrival at Wiesbaden Air Base, a former Luftwaffe fighter base with limited facilities, the group was attached to the 7489th Air Force Wing. However, the Royal Air Force had made improvements to several of their bases in the British Zone of Occupation and began to open them for use by American units participating in the airlift. In December, the group moved to one of these fields, Celle RAF Station, which permitted it to make supply flights to Berlin over flat terrain through the shorter Northern Corridor to Berlin. Once the 317th Wing moved to Celle in January 1949, the group was relieved of its attachment to the 7489th Wing. The group participated in Operation Vittles, the Berlin Airlift, until 31 July 1949. It was typical for the group to fly 100 round trips to Berlin a day during the airlift carrying various cargo, but mostly coal. After the end of the Airlift the Air Force directed that all units operating from the British Zone of Occupation be withdrawn and returned to the United States and the group became non-operational in August. However, President Truman's reduced 1949 defense budget also required reductions in the number of groups in the Air Force to 48, and the group was inactivated in September and its planes redistributed to other units or returned to the United States.

=== Cold War to Desert Storm ===
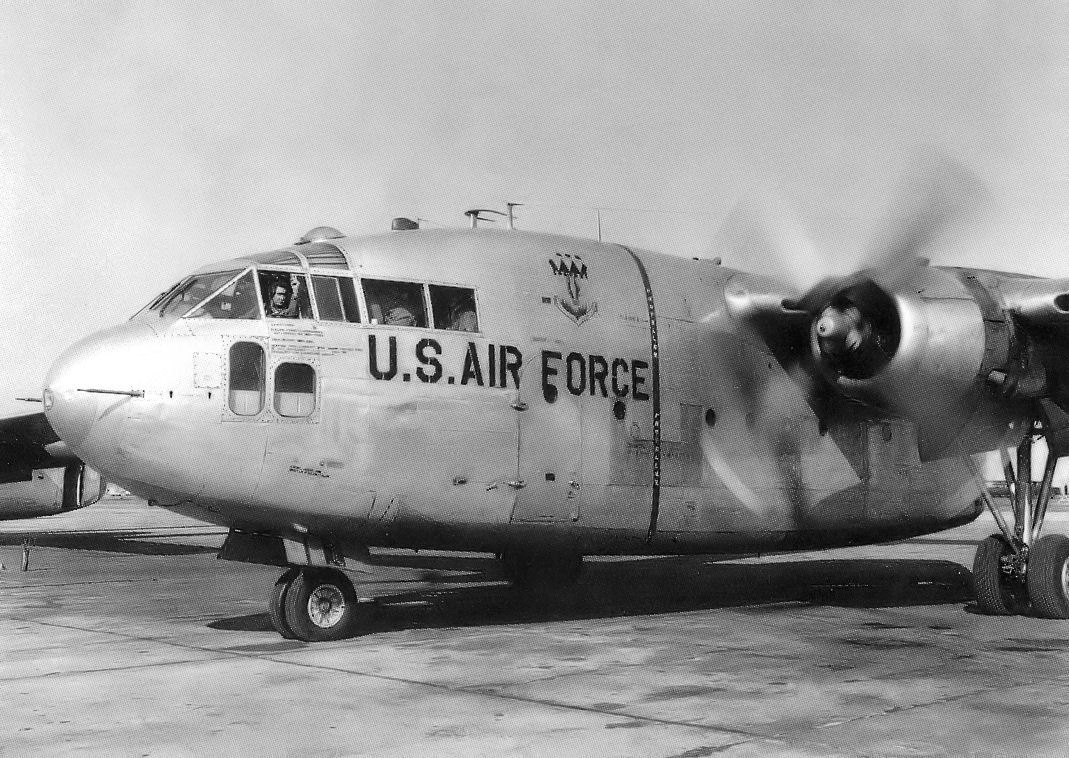
317th C-119 Flying Boxcar

The 317th Became a theater airlift organization, trading in its "Heavy" designation for "Medium" in July 1952 when it was activated at Rhein-Main Air Base, Germany. It used Fairchild C-119 Flying Boxcars for troop carrier and airlift service, participating in numerous exercises and humanitarian missions. The group became non-operational in 1955 and its squadrons were attached to wing headquarters. It was inactivated at Neubiberg Air Base in March 1957.

The group was redesignated 317th Tactical Airlift Group and once again became responsible for the 317th Wing's operational squadrons at Pope Air Force Base in September 1978, although one squadron was typically deployed with the 313th Tactical Airlift Group at RAF Mildenhall. It was inactivated in April 1980 and its squadrons returned to the control of the wing.

The final activation of the group began as the Objective Wing organization was implemented in January 1992. As the 317th Operations Group it once again assumed responsibility for the 317th Wing's flying operations. The group was activated during Operation Desert Storm, and deployed forces of the 317th airlifted American and allied combat troops deep inside Iraqi territory to support the flanking maneuver that led to the surrender of Iraq's Republican Guard. It was inactivated a little over a year later, when airlift and fighter units at Pope were combined into a single wing, the 23d Wing.

== Lineage ==
- Constituted as the 317th Transport Group on 2 February 1942

Activated on 22 February 1942

- Redesignated 317th Troop Carrier Group on 4 July 1942

Redesignated 317th Troop Carrier Group, Heavy on 21 May 1948
Inactivated on 14 September 1949

- Redesignated 317th Troop Carrier Group, Medium on 3 July 1952

Activated on 14 July 1952
Inactivated on 12 March 1957

- Redesignated: 317th Tactical Airlift Group

Activated on 15 September 1978
Inactivated on 1 April 1980

- Redesignated: 317th Operations Group

Activated on 1 January 1992
Inactivated on 16 July 1993

=== Assignments ===
- Air Transport Command (later I Troop Carrier Command), 22 February 1942 – 22 December 1942 (attached to 52d Transport Wing (later 52d Troop Carrier Wing)
- Fifth Air Force, 23 January 1943
- 54th Troop Carrier Wing, 1 October 1943
- Fifth Air Force, 15 January 1946
- 317th Troop Carrier Wing, 18 August 1948 – 14 September 1949 (attached to 7489th Air Force Wing 21 September 1948 – 8 January 1949, not operational after c. 31 August 1949)
- 317th Troop Carrier Wing, 14 July 1952 – 12 March 1957 (not operational after 8 May 1955)
- 317th Tactical Airlift Wing, 15 September 1978 – 1 April 1980 (not operational until 30 September 1978)
- 317th Airlift Wing, 1 January 1992 – 16 July 1993

=== Components ===
- 3rd Air Cargo Control Squadron, 5 January – 20 May 1946
- 39th Transport Squadron (later 39th Troop Carrier Squadron, 39th Tactical Airlift Squadron, 39th Airlift Squadron): 22 February 1942 – 14 September 1949, 14 July 1952 – 12 March 1957, 15 September 1978 – 1 April 1980 (attached to 313th Tactical Airlift Group 5 June – 14 August 1979), 1 January 1992 – 1 June 1992 (attached to 313th Tactical Airlift Group after 3 April 1992)
- 40th Transport Squadron (later 40th Troop Carrier Squadron, 40th Tactical Airlift Squadron, 40th Airlift Squadron): 22 February 1942 – 14 September 1949, 14 July 1952 – 12 March 1957, 15 September 1978 – 1 April 1980 (attached to 313 Tactical Airlift Group, 29 November 1978 – 16 February 1979), 1 January 1992 – 16 July 1993
- 41st Transport Squadron (later 41st Troop Carrier Squadron, 41st Tactical Airlift Squadron, 41st Airlift Squadron): 22 February 1942 – 14 September 1949, 14 July 1952 – 12 March 1957, 15 September 1978 – 1 April 1980 (attached to 313 Tactical Airlift Group, 5 December 1979 – 12 February 1980), 1 January 1992 – 16 July 1993
- 46th Transport Squadron (later 46th Troop Carrier Squadron): 15 June 1942 – 18 August 1948
- 317th Operations Support Squadron: 1 January 1992 – 16 July 1993

=== Stations ===
- Duncan Field, Texas, 22 February 1942
- Bowman Field, Kentucky, 19 June 1942
- Lawson Field, Georgia, 11 October 1942
- Laurinburg-Maxton Airport, North Carolina, 3 – 12 December 1942
- RAAF Base Townsville, Australia, 23 January 1943
- Port Moresby Airfield Complex, New Guinea, c. 30 September 1943
- Finschhafen Airfield, New Guinea, April 1944
- Hollandia Airfield Complex, Netherlands East Indies, June 1944
- Dulag Airfield, Leyte, Philippines, 17 November 1944
- Clark Field, Luzon, Philippines, c. 17 March 1945
- Motobu Airfield, Okinawa, 25 August 1945
- Kimpo Airfield, Korea, 31 October 1945
- Tachikawa Airfield, Japan, c. 15 January 1946 – c. 21 September 1948
- Wiesbaden Air Base, Germany, c. 30 September 1948
- Celle RAF Station, Germany, 15 December 1948 – 14 September 1949
- Rhein-Main Air Base, West Germany, 14 July 1952
- Neubiberg Air Base, West Germany, 21 March 1953 – 12 March 1957
- Pope Air Force Base, North Carolina, 15 September 1978 – 1 April 1980
- Pope Air Force Base, North Carolina, 1 January 1992 – 16 July 1993

=== Aircraft ===
- Douglas C-47 Skytrain, 1942–1948
- Boeing B-17 Flying Fortress, 1943
- Consolidated B-24 Liberator, 1943 (Note: So in Cutler, p. 39. Maurer, Combat Squadrons, p. 195 indicates the Liberator model was the export LB-30.)
- Douglas C-39, 1943
- Lockheed C-60, 1943
- Curtiss C-46 Commando, 1948
- Douglas C-54 Skymaster, 1948–1949
- Fairchild C-119 Flying Boxcar, 1952–1957
- Lockheed C-130 Hercules, 1978–1980, 1992–1993

=== Awards and campaigns ===
Award streamer	Award	Dates	Notes
	Distinguished Unit Citation	30 January 1943-1 February 1943	Papua New Guinea 317th Troop Carrier Group
	Distinguished Unit Citation	16 February 1945-17 February 1945	Philippines 317th Troop Carrier Group
	Air Force Outstanding Unit Award	1 June 1979-1 April 1980	317th Tactical Airlift Group
	Philippine Republic Presidential Unit Citation	17 November 1944-4 July 1945	317th Troop Carrier Group

Campaign Streamer	Campaign	Dates	Notes
	Air Offensive, Japan	23 January 1943 – 2 September 1945	317th Troop Carrier Group
	New Guinea	24 January 1943 – 31 December 1944	317th Troop Carrier Group
	Northern Solomons	23 February 1943 – 21 November 1944	317th Troop Carrier Group
	Bismarck Archipelago	15 December 1943 – 27 November 1944	317th Troop Carrier Group
	Western Pacific	17 April 1944 – 2 September 1945	317th Troop Carrier Group
	Leyte	17 October 1944 – 1 July 1945	317th Troop Carrier Group
	Luzon	15 December 1944 – 4 July 1945	317th Troop Carrier Group
	World War II Army of Occupation (Japan and Germany)	3 September 1945 – 2 September 1949	317th Troop Carrier Group

== See also ==
- Bakers Creek air crash
- List of Douglas C-47 Skytrain operators
- List of Lockheed C-130 Hercules operators
- United States Army Air Forces in Australia
