= Dyess Air Force Base =

US Air Force base near Abilene, Texas, United States

- Near Abilene, Texas in United States
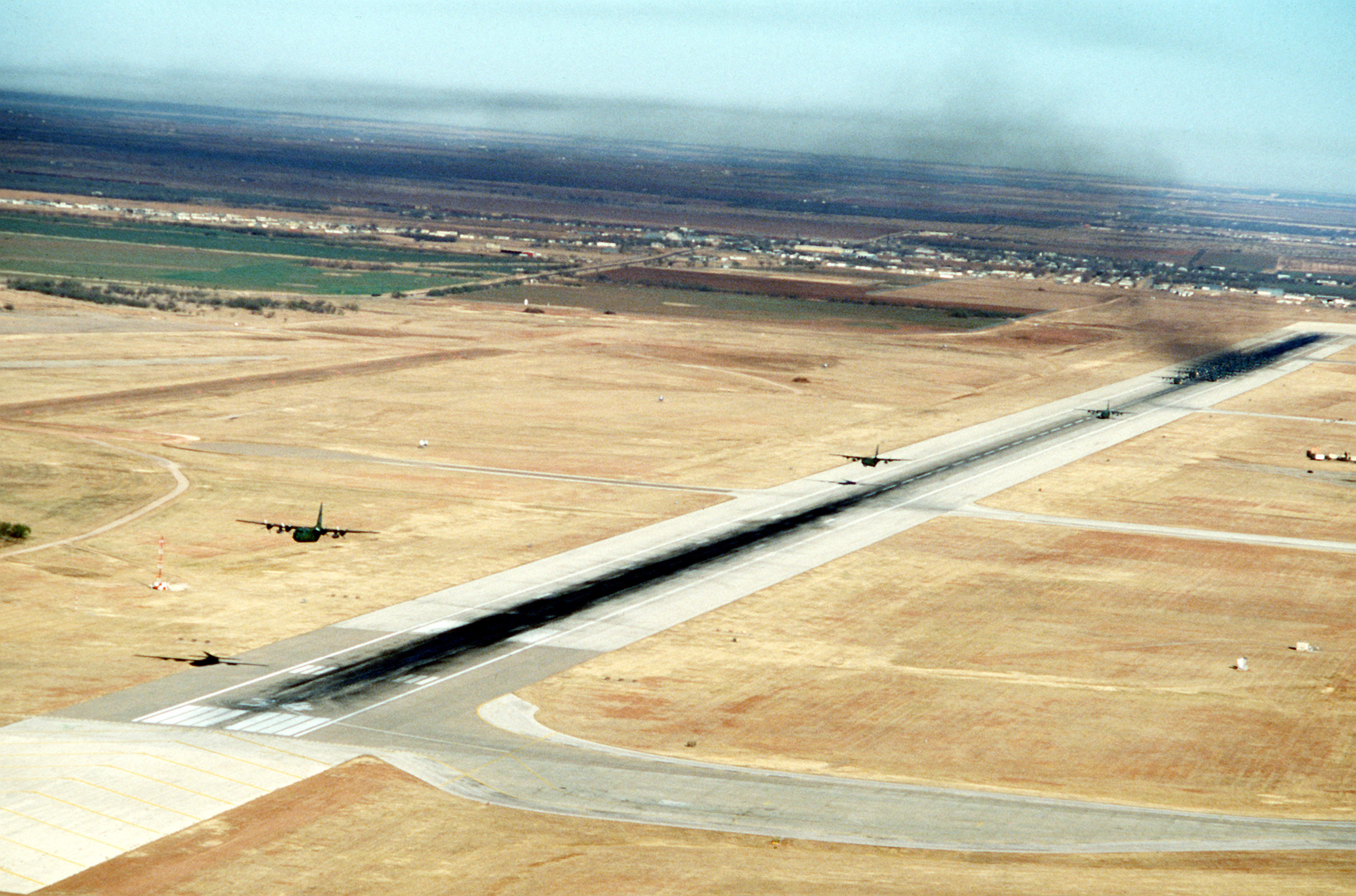

Site information
- Type: US Air Force Base
- Owner: Department of Defense
- Operator: United States Air Force
- Controlled by: Air Force Global Strike Command
- Condition: Operational
- Website: www.dyess.af.mil

Location
- Location in North America Location in the United States Location in Texas
- Coordinates: 32°25′15″N 099°51′17″W

Site history
- Built: 1942 (as Tye Army Air Field)
- In use: 1942 – present

Garrison information
- Garrison: 7th Bomb Wing (Host); 317th Airlift Wing

Airfield information
- Identifiers: IATA: DYS, ICAO: KDYS, WMO: 690190
- Elevation: 545.6 metres (1,790 ft) AMSL
Runways
Direction	Length and surface
16/34	4,114.8 metres (13,500 ft) PEM
164°/344° Strip	1,066.2 metres (3,498 ft) Asphalt
163°/343° Strip	1,066.8 metres (3,500 ft) Graded or rolled earth
- Other airfield facilities: Marion drop zone

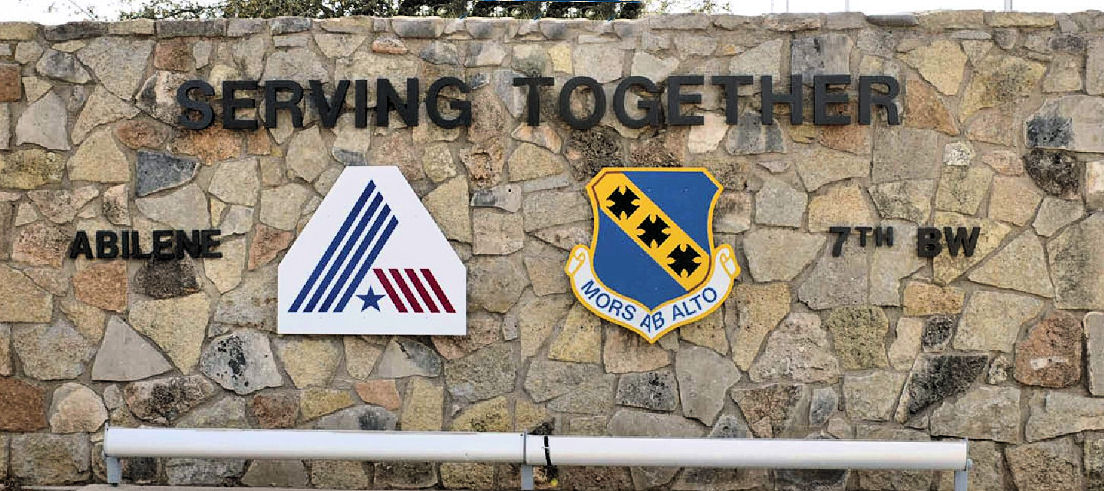
Main gate entrance sign

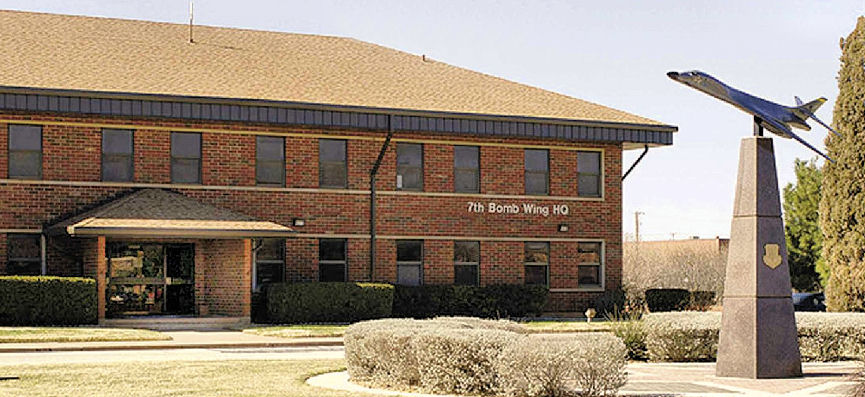
7th Bomb Wing Headquarters

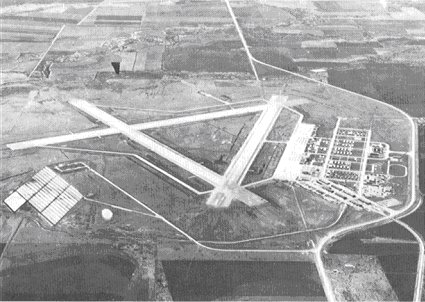
Abilene Army Airfield, mid-1940s.

Dyess Air Force Base (AFB) (IATA: DYS, ICAO: KDYS, FAA LID: DYS) is a United States Air Force (USAF) base located about 7 miles (11 km) southwest of downtown Abilene, Texas, and 150 miles (240 km) west of Fort Worth, Texas.

The host unit at Dyess is the 7th Bomb Wing assigned to the Global Strike Command Eighth Air Force. The wing is one of only two Rockwell B-1B Lancer strategic bomber wings in the USAF, the other being the 28th Bomb Wing at Ellsworth Air Force Base, South Dakota.

The 317th Airlift Wing, assigned to Air Mobility Command Eighteenth Air Force, is a tenant unit and one of four world-wide active-duty locations for the C-130 Hercules military transport aircraft.

Dyess AFB was established in 1942 as Abilene Army Air Base. It was renamed in honor of Texas native and Bataan Death March survivor Lieutenant Colonel William Dyess. As of 2023, the 7th Bomb Wing is commanded by Colonel Seth W. Spanier. The vice commander is Colonel Samuel M. Friend and the command chief master sergeant is Chief Master Sergeant Richelle D. Baker.

Dyess covers 6,409 acres (25.94 km^{2}), and is home to the 7th Bomb Wing, which consists of four groups. The 9th and 28th Bomb Squadrons fly the B-1B. In addition, the 28th Bomb Squadron is the USAF schoolhouse for all B-1B aircrew members.

The base employs more than 5,000 people, making it the single largest employer in the area. Dyess AFB has nearly 200 facilities on base, plus 988 units of family housing, and encompasses 6,117 acres (24.75 km^{2}) of land. The base has a total economic impact of nearly $310 million yearly on the local community.

== History ==
The base is named after Lt Col William Edwin Dyess, a native of Albany, Texas, who was captured by the Japanese on Bataan in April 1942. Dyess escaped in April 1943 and fought with guerilla forces on Mindanao until evacuated by submarine in July 1943. During retraining in the United States, his P-38 Lightning caught fire in flight on 23 December 1943 near Burbank, California. He refused to bail out over a populated area, and died while attempting to crash-land his plane in a vacant lot.

=== World War II ===
In 1942, the United States Army Air Forces built Tye Army Air Field, as it was popularly known, on the site of what is now known as Dyess AFB. On 18 December 1942, the field was opened and was initially named Abilene Army Air Base. The name was changed on 8 April 1943 to Abilene Army Airfield. The first host unit as Abilene AAB was the 474th Base HQ and Airbase Squadron, established on 18 December 1942. The airfield was initially assigned to Second Air Force and its mission was to be a flying training center for cadets.

Known groups that trained at the base during the war were:

- 77th Reconnaissance Group (6 April 1943 – 12 September 1943)
- 69th Tactical Reconnaissance Group (10 September 1943 – 12 November 1943)
- 408th Fighter-Bomber Group (10 November 1943 – January 1944)

The 77th and 69th groups were units that trained reconnaissance personnel who later served overseas. The 408th was a new group that received A-24, A-26, P-40, and P-47 aircraft in October 1943 and began training. It was disbanded shortly after leaving Abilene on 1 April 1944.

On 25 March 1944, Republic P-47 Thunderbolt training for flight cadets was taken over by the 261st Army Air Force Base Unit. Training continued until 1 April 1946.

With the end of the war, the base was declared inactive on 31 January 1946. Although assigned to Continental Air Command, Abilene AAF was classified as an inactive subbase of Fort Worth Army Airfield and was sold to the city of Abilene for $1. It was used as a training facility for the Texas Army National Guard for several years.

=== Cold War ===
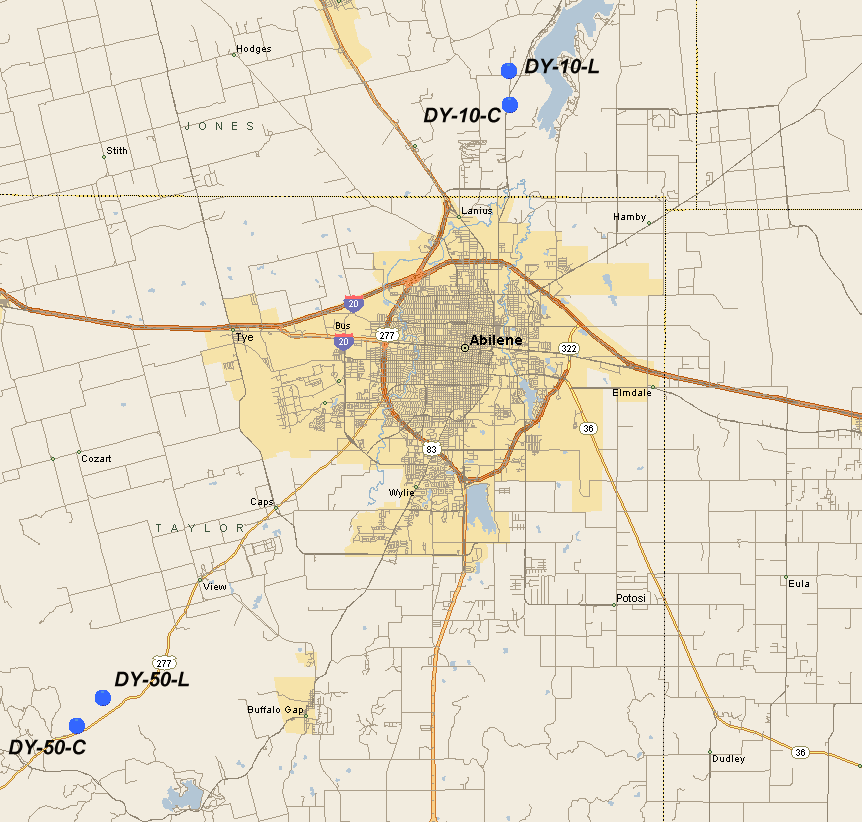
Nike missile sites around Dyess AFB

Shortly after the Korean War broke out, the city of Abilene called for the need of a military installation. They believed the 1,500 acres (6 km^{2}) of the former Tye AAF were the perfect site for a new base. The city's leaders went to the Pentagon with their request. The city showed their determination for a new base by raising almost $1 million to purchase an additional 3,500 acres (14 km^{2}) adjacent to the site. They were able to attract then U.S. Senator Lyndon B. Johnson's (D-TX) attention, who had the power to persuade military officials to reactivate the base in Abilene. Finally, in July 1952, Congress approved the $32 million needed to construct an air force base on the Tye AAF site. It was to be called Abilene Air Force Base, and a little over three years after first starting construction, the base was opened on 15 April 1956.

Dyess' first active combat unit was the 341st Bombardment Wing, which activated on 1 September 1955. The 341st was part of the Strategic Air Command (SAC), flying the B-47 Stratojet, which it continued to operate until its inactivation on 25 June 1961.

On 1 December 1956, the name of the base was changed to Dyess Air Force Base in honor of the late Lt Col William E. Dyess, USAAF.

The 96th Bombardment Wing moved to Dyess on 8 September 1957 and for a few years worked alongside the 341st. It included not just B-47 and B-52 nuclear bombers, but also the KC-97 and later on the KC-135 refueling aircraft. During the Cold War, the base was constantly on alert in case of nuclear attack. Even the base's movie theater featured signs that instantly alerted pilots of a possible Soviet nuclear attack.

During the Vietnam War, B-52s and KC-135s (917th ARS) from the 96th BW participated heavily in various air campaigns, including Arc Light, Young Tiger, Bullet Shot, Linebacker, and Linebacker II missions over North and South Vietnam. The B-52s flew combat missions primarily out of Andersen AFB, Guam, and Utapao RTAFB, Thailand, during these missions. The KC-135As flew primarily out of Utapao RTAFB, Thailand; Clark AFB, the Philippines; Kadena AFB, Okinawa; Andersen AFB, Guam; and NAS Agana, Guam.

On 19 November 1959, the United States Army conducted groundbreaking ceremonies at Dyess AFB for the battalion headquarters of the 5th Missile Battalion, 517th Artillery of the U.S. Army Air Defense Command. Installed to defend the SAC bombers and Atlas F missile silos stationed at and around Dyess AFB, the two Nike Hercules sites were controlled by a "BIRDIE" system installed at Sweetwater Air Force Station. Site DY-10, located at Fort Phantom Hill 32°34′49″N 099°43′02″W and site DY-50, located southwest of Abilene 32°16′17″N 099°57′32″W, remained operational from 1960 until 1966.

Units stationed at Dyess Air Force Base while the 5/517th was operational included SAC's 819th Strategic Aerospace Division, the 96th BW, and the 578th Strategic Missile Squadron. Several of the 578th's Altas F Silos are located near the Nike sites. The Army Air Defense Command Post was located 37 miles west at Sweetwater AFS. Both of the sites were located near former Army posts. Camp Barkeley served as a World War II infantry division training center, while Fort Phantom Hill was a frontier outpost and stop on the Butterfield stage route.

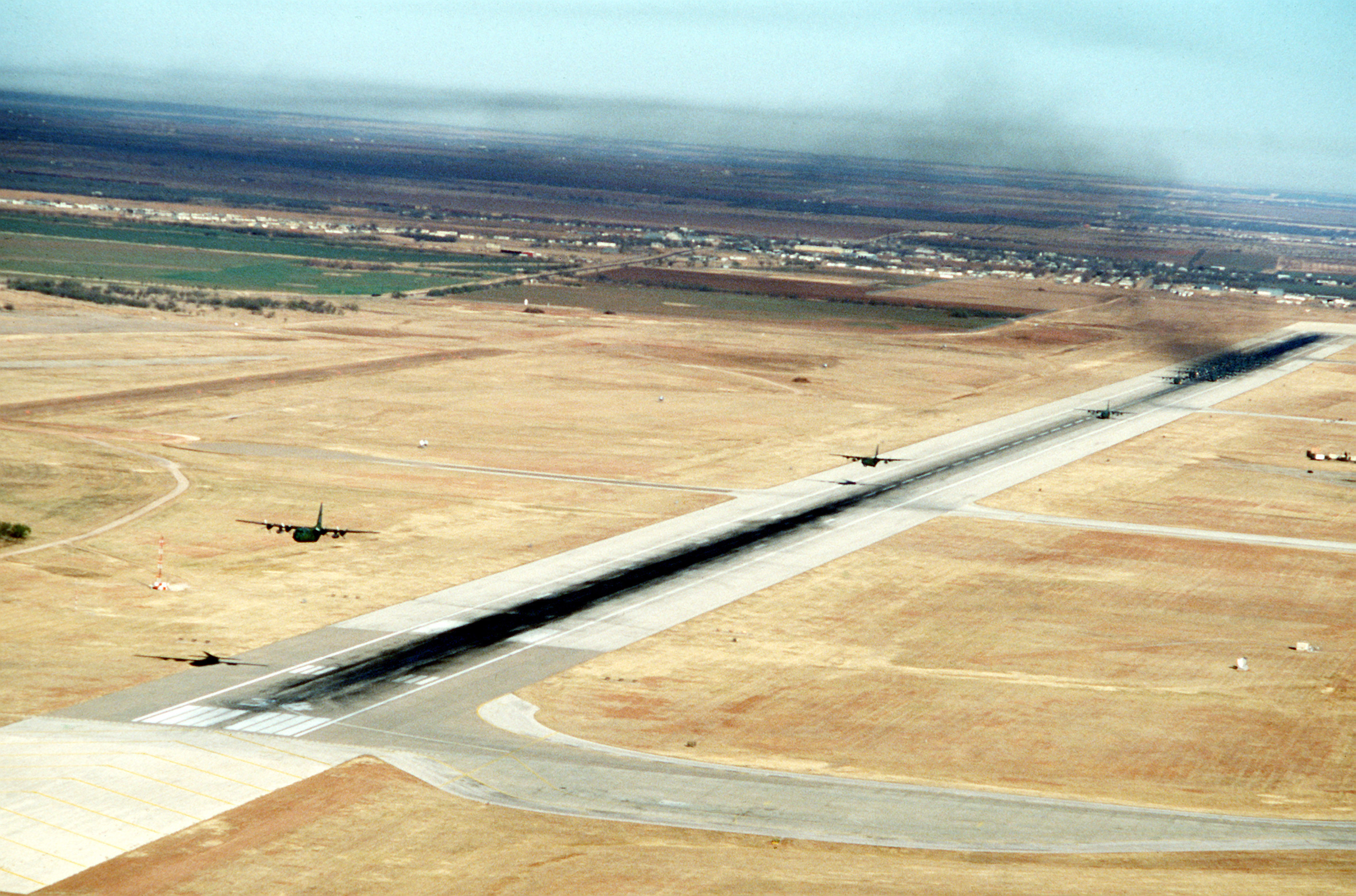
A C-130 aircraft departs in a minimum-interval takeoff at Dyess during a mass airdrop exercise, December 1988.

Since 1961, various models of C-130 Hercules aircraft have been stationed at Dyess AFB. The C-130s were originally assigned to the 64th Troop Carrier Wing (TCW) and from 1963 to 1972, the 516th TCW was the host C-130 wing. In 1972, the 516th TCW was replaced with the 463rd Tactical Airlift Wing (463 TAW). During the Vietnam War, TAC C-130 crews routinely rotated to forward-based C-130 wings in the Pacific theater to support operations in Vietnam. In 1974, the 463 TAW was reassigned from Tactical Air Command to Military Airlift Command (MAC) as part of a USAF-wide initiative to place both strategic and tactical airlift assets under MAC control.

From 1962 to 1965, Dyess Air Force Base had 12 SM-65 Atlas missile sites stationed around it. The Dyess sites were operated by the 578th Strategic Missile Squadron. After being decommissioned in 1965, the Atlas missiles were removed and all sites demilitarized.

In June 1985, the 96th received its first Rockwell B-1B Lancer to replace the B-52 Stratofortress, and in October 1986, assumed nuclear-alert status. Since achieving IOC, Dyess has been recognized as the premier bomber-training center and leads the fleet in maintaining the highest mission-capability status of its aircraft, avionics test stations, and support equipment. Shortly after, the Soviet Union fell and left many wondering the fate of the base. In 1991, the 463rd Tactical Airlift Wing was simply designated the 463rd Airlift Wing (463 AW). In October 1992, the parent commands of both wings changed. The 96 BW was reassigned to the newly established Air Combat Command, and the 463 AW was assigned to the new Air Mobility Command.

=== The 1990s ===
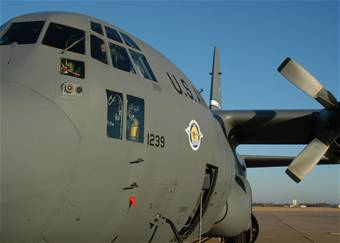
The number-two ship of the C-130 Avionic Modernization Program from Edwards Air Force Base, California, visited Dyess 27 November 2007. The program was to update the avionics on more than 400 C-130s. Part of the program included a new navigation system, a heads-up display, an all-digital cockpit, and other technology advances.

On 1 October 1993, the 96 BW and 463 AW were both inactivated and replaced by the 7th Wing, a former B-52 and KC-135 wing that had been located at the former Carswell AFB, which was being realigned as NAS Fort Worth JRB/Carswell ARS as a result of Base Realignment and Closure action. The 7th Wing incorporated Dyess' B-1Bs and C-130s, the latter of which transferred from Air Mobility Command to Air Combat Command.

Within its first year, the 7th Wing's diverse mission made it one of the most active units in the USAF. The C-130s were deployed around the globe performing several airlift missions to Europe and the Persian Gulf. The crews and support people of the B-1s focused on enhancing the purpose of the Lancer in a post-Soviet 21st century.

In 1997, Dyess' C-130s were transferred back to Air Mobility Command, and the 317th Airlift Group was reactivated as the parent unit for Dyess' C-130 squadrons. At the same time, the 7th Wing was redesignated the 7th Bomb Wing. Despite this separation as units, both the 7th Bomb Wing and the 317th Airlift Group remained at Dyess.

One of the many unique features of Dyess is its extensive collection of static military aircraft on display. Collectively known as the "Dyess Linear Air Park", it contains 34 aircraft, seven inert ordinances, and one model from World War II to the present, many of them formerly based at Dyess, and is located along the base's main road, Arnold Blvd. All but one plane had been flown before. Its most recent addition is the first operational B-1B Lancer, known as The Star of Abilene, which made its final flight in 2003. It can be seen at the front gate to Dyess along with a recently retired C-130 Hercules located on the other side of the road (a tribute to the two main aircraft currently housed at Dyess).

Another unique feature of Dyess is its main source of energy. In January 2003, Dyess became the first Department of Defense installation in the United States to be powered exclusively from renewable wind energy. Today, most of the energy Dyess receives is from other sources of renewable energy, such as biomass, and is considered one of the "greenest" bases in the USAF.

The remnants of Tye AAF can still be seen today. Parts of the old runway still exist, as well as part of its parking area on the west side of Dyess.

=== Global War on Terrorism ===
The 7th Bomb Wing and 317th Airlift Group were called to duty once again shortly after 11 September 2001. Both played and continue to play vital roles in both Operation Enduring Freedom (OEF) and Operation Iraqi Freedom (OIF). Many of the 7 BW's B-1s and support personnel deploy to Southwest Asia. From there, the 7 BW provides close air support to troops in the field and precision strike missions with the B-1B Lancer. The 317th Airlift Group has been deployed continuously to Southwest Asia since December 2003, where the group provides airlift support to OIF, OEF, and Combined Joint Task Force-Horn of Africa operations.

On 1 October 2015, Dyess became part of Global Strike Command.

== Role and operations ==
The host unit at Dyess is the 7th Bomb Wing of the Global Strike Command, which was activated on 1 October 1993. The wing performs combat training with the Boeing B-1B Lancer bomber and is the USAF's premier operational B-1B unit with 36 aircraft.

The wing consists of these groups:

- 7th Operations Group (Tail Code: "DY") - Responsible for executing global conventional bombing directed by proper command authority, it is the Air Force's largest B-1 operations group comprising 36 B-1s.
  - 28th Bomb Squadron (B-1B) (blue/white chex tail stripe)
  - 9th Bomb Squadron (B-1B) (black tail stripe with a white bat silhouette centered on the tail stripe)
  - 7th Operations Support Squadron
- 7th Mission Support Group
- 7th Maintenance Group
- 7th Medical Group

The 317th Airlift Wing (317 AW), an Air Mobility Command tenant unit, performs Lockheed Martin C-130J Super Hercules airlift missions with 28 aircraft assigned. The wing is now the largest C-130J unit in the world.

The 317 AW consists of:

- 39th Airlift Squadron "Trail Blazers" (C-130J) ("Dyess" Texas state flag tail stripe)
- 40th Airlift Squadron "Screaming Eagles" (C-130J) ("Dyess" Texas state flag tail stripe)
- 317th Maintenance Squadron
- 317th Aircraft Maintenance Squadron
- 317th Maintenance Operations Squadron (inactivated June 2013)
- 317th Operations Support Squadron

Dyess AFB is also home to several tenant units, including Air Force Office of Special Investigations Detachment 222.

== Based units ==
Flying and notable nonflying units based at Dyess Air Force Base:

Units marked GSU are geographically separate units, which although based at Dyess, are subordinate to a parent unit based at another location.

=== United States Air Force ===
Air Force Global Strike Command (AFGSC)

- Eighth Air Force
  - 7th Bomb Wing (host wing)
    - 7th Operations Group
      - 7th Operations Support Squadron
      - 9th Bomb Squadron – B-1B Lancer
      - 28th Bomb Squadron – B-1B Lancer
    - 7th Mission Support Group
      - 7th Civil Engineer Squadron
      - 7th Contracting Squadron
      - 7th Communications Squadron
      - 7th Force Support Squadron
      - 7th Logistics Readiness Squadron
      - 7th Security Forces Squadron
    - 7th Maintenance Group
      - 7th Aircraft Maintenance Squadron
      - 7th Component Maintenance Squadron
      - 7th Equipment Maintenance Squadron
      - 7th Munitions Squadron
    - 7th Medical Group
      - 7th Aerospace Medicine Squadron/ Redesignated 7th Operational Medical Readiness Squadron (2019)
      - 7th Medical Operations Squadron/ Redesignated 7th Health Care Operations Squadron (2019)
      - 7th Medical Support Squadron (Inactivated 24 Jun 2022, assets dispersed to 7 HCOS and 7 MDOS)

Air Mobility Command (AMC)

- Eighteenth Air Force
  - 317th Airlift Wing
    - 317th Operations Group
      - 39th Airlift Squadron – C-130J Super Hercules
      - 40th Airlift Squadron – C-130J Super Hercules
      - 317th Operations Support Squadron
    - 317th Maintenance Group
      - 317th Aircraft Maintenance Squadron
      - 317th Maintenance Squadron

Air Combat Command (ACC)

- US Air Force Warfare Center
  - 53rd Wing
    - 53rd Test and Evaluation Group
      - 337th Test and Evaluation Squadron (GSU) – B-1B Lancer
    - 53rd Test Management Group
      - 29th Training Systems Squadron (GSU)– B-1B Lancer
  - 57th Wing
    - USAF Weapons School
      - 77th Weapons Squadron (GSU)– B-1B Lancer
- 436th Training Squadron (GSU)

Air Force Reserve Command (AFRC)

- Tenth Air Force
  - 307th Bomb Wing
    - 489th Bomb Group (GSU)
      - 489th Aerospace Medicine Flight
      - 345th Bomb Squadron – B-1B Lancer
      - 489th Maintenance Squadron

== Previous names ==
- Established as: Abilene Army Air Base, 18 December 1942

Prior to this date popularly known as Tye Field and Tye Army Air Base

- Abilene Army Airfield, 8 April 1943 – 13 January 1947
- Abilene Air Force Base, 1 October 1953
- Dyess Air Force Base, 1 December 1956–present

== Major commands to which assigned ==
- Second Air Force, 13 October 1942
- Third Air Force, 2 March 1943
- Second Air Force, 15 November 1943
- Continental Air Forces, 16 April 1945 – 31 January 1946
- Strategic Air Command, 1 October 1953 to 31 May 1992
- Air Combat Command, 1 June 1992 – 30 September 2015
- Global Strike Command, 1 October 2015 – present

== Base operating units ==
- 474th HQ and Air Base Sq, 18 December 1942
- 261st AAF Base Unit, 1 April 1944
- 233d AAF Base Unit (Det), March 1946-c. January 1947
- 4021st Air Base Sq, 1 January 1955
- 341st Air Base Gp, 1 September 1955
- 819th Air Base Gp, 15 June 1956 (rdsgd 819th Combat Support Gp, 1 November 1958)
- 96th Combat Support Gp, 25 June 1961
- 96th Support Gp (SAC), 03 September 1991
- 96th Support Gp (ACC), 01 June 1992
- 7th Mission Support Group, 1 October 1993–present

== Major units assigned ==
- 69th Tactical Reconnaissance Group, 10 September 1943 – 12 November 1943
- 77th Reconnaissance Group, 6 April-12 September 1943
- 408th Fighter-Bomber Group, 10 November 1943 – January 1944
- 341st Bombardment Wing (SAC), 1 September 1955 – 25 June 1961
- 819th Air Division, 1 February 1956 – 2 July 1966
- 96th Bombardment Wing (SAC/ACC), 8 September 1957 – 1 October 1993
- 64th Troop Carrier Wing (TAC), 8 February 1961 – 1 January 1963
- 516th Tactical Airlift Wing (TAC), 19 July 1962 – 1 June 1972
- 463d Tactical Airlift Wing (TAC/MAC), 1 June 1972 - 1 October 1993
- 12th Air Division, 30 September 1976 – 15 July 1988
- 7th Bomb Wing (ACC/AFGSC), 1 October 1993–present

== Education ==
No schools are located on-post.

Abilene Independent School District is the school district covering the base. The zoned schools are Dyess Elementary School, Clack Middle School, and Cooper High School. The current building of the elementary school, named after William E. Dyess, opened in 2021. Dyess Elementary, which started operations in 1957, is in proximity to Dyess AFB. The previous Dyess campus had a de-commissioned military aircraft. The plans for the new campus had it aircraft-themed, and the school mascot is the jet. Dependent children on-post who go to Abilene ISD schools get school bus service to Clack and Cooper.

== SM-65F Atlas missile sites ==
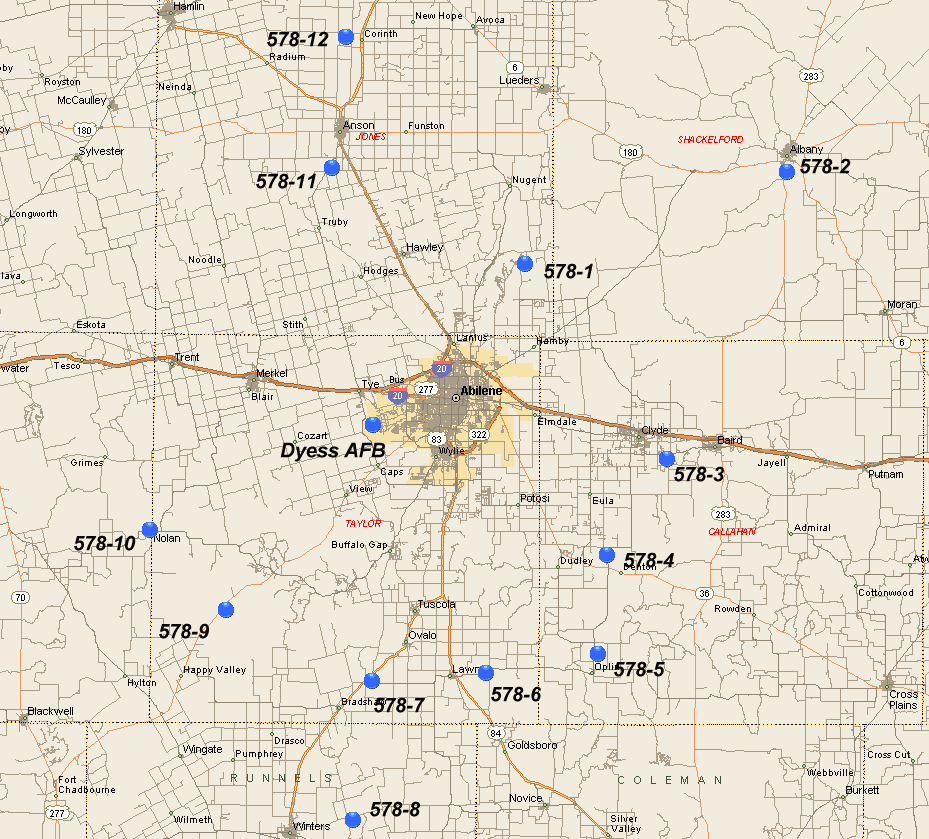
SM-65F Atlas Missile Sites

The 578th Strategic Missile Squadron operated twelve missile sites, of one missile at each site.

- 578–1 1.5 mi SE of Lake Fort Phantom Hill, TX 32°36′09″N 099°38′59″W
- 578–2 1.5 mi S of Albany, TX 32°42′23″N 099°17′51″W
- 578–3 2.5 mi SE of Clyde, TX 32°22′54″N 099°27′37″W
- 578–4 9.6 mi SSW of Clyde, TX 32°16′25″N 099°32′28″W
- 578–5 1.5 mi SE of Lake Coleman, TX 32°09′42″N 099°33′10″W
- 578–6 2.7 mi E of Lawn, TX 32°08′25″N 099°42′12″W
- 578–7 3.4 mi NE of Bradshaw, TX 32°07′51″N 099°51′18″W
- 578–8 4.9 mi ENE of Winters, TX 31°58′24″N 099°52′48″W
- 578–9 11.9 mi NW of Bradshaw, TX 32°12′37″N 100°03′03″W
- 578–10 13.1 mi S of Trent, TX 32°18′05″N 100°09′11″W
- 578–11 3.2 mi SSW of Anson, TX 32°42′40″N 099°54′34″W
- 578–12 1.4 mi WNW of Corinth, TX 32°51′37″N 099°53′29″W

== See also ==
- List of United States Air Force installations
- Texas World War II Army Airfields
