= 41st Airlift Squadron =

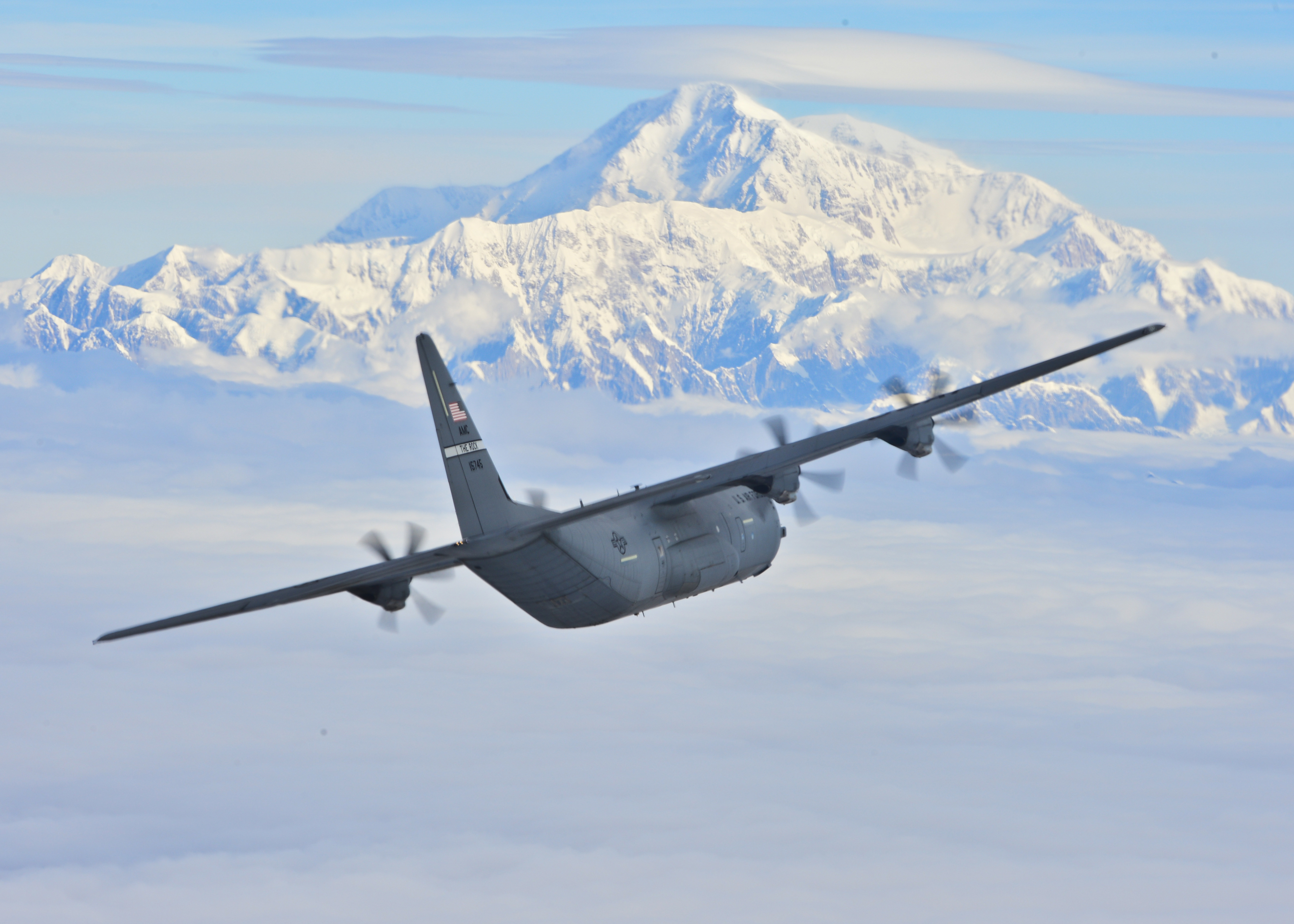
- A squadron C-130J Super Hercules flies past Denali
- Active: 1942–1949; 1952–1971; 1971–present
- Country: United States
- Branch: United States Air Force
- Role: Airlift
- Part of: Air Mobility Command
- Garrison/HQ: Little Rock Air Force Base
- Nickname: Blackcats Felix
- Engagements: Southwest Pacific Theater; Operation Just Cause; Desert Storm; War on terrorism
- Decorations: Distinguished Unit Citation; Presidential Unit Citation; Air Force Meritorious Unit Award; Air Force Outstanding Unit Award; Philippine Presidential Unit Citation; Republic of Vietnam Gallantry Cross with Palm

Commanders
- Current commander: Lt. Col. James Vanderneck

Insignia
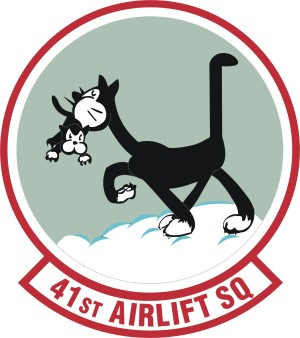
- 41st Airlift Squadron emblem (17 August 2007)

The 41st Airlift Squadron is a United States Air Force unit assigned to the Air Mobility Command's 19th Airlift Wing at Little Rock Air Force Base, Arkansas. It operates Lockheed C-130J Super Hercules aircraft.

The 41st AS became Air Mobility Command's first active-duty C-130J combat unit during 2007.

== History ==
=== World War II ===
The squadron was constituted as 41 Transport Squadron on 2 Feb 1942. Activated on 18 Feb 1942 at Duncan Field, Texas. Redesignated as: 41 Troop Carrier Squadron on 4 July 1942. The 41st participated in airborne drops on Nadzab, Noemfoor, Tagaytay, Corregidor, and Aparri, as well as aerial transportation in South, Southwest, and Western Pacific, during World War II.

While stationed at the Hollandia Airfield Complex, the squadron rebuilt a captured Nakajima Ki-43 Oscar fighter.

=== Occupation of Japan and Berlin Airlift ===
Redesignated 41 Troop Carrier Squadron, Heavy, on 30 June 1948 and participated in the Berlin Airlift in 1948. The 41st was inactivated on 14 Sep 1949.

=== Airlift and operations from Okinawa ===
Redesignated as 41 Troop Carrier Squadron, Medium, on 3 July 1952 and activated on 14 July 1952. The squadron transported troops to join the United Nations Operation in the Congo (ONUC) in the former Belgian Congo in 1960. In November 1965 the squadron was moved from Lockbourne AFB, Ohio, to Naha Air Base, in Okinawa, Japan. It was redesignated as the 41 Troop Carrier Squadron on 8 Dec 1965. It airlifted personnel and equipment to Southeast Asia from Ryukyu Islands from, 1965–1971. The 41 Troop Carrier Squadron was renamed 41 Tactical Airlift Squadron on 1 August 1967. Airlifted personnel and equipment in and around Korea during the USS Pueblo (AGER-2) crisis in January 1968.

The squadron was inactivated in Okinawa on 28 February 1971.

=== European deployments and expeditionary operations ===
The squadron was reactivated on 31 August 1971 at Pope AFB, NC. It has supported U.S. Army training and performed rotational duty throughout Europe, since 1971. The 41st airlifted personnel, special forces and supplies during operations in Grenada in 1983, Panama from December 1989 – January 1990, and in Southwest Asia from, 11 August 1990 – 21 March 1991. Redesignated as the 41st Airlift Squadron on 1 January 1992.

=== Twenty-first century ===
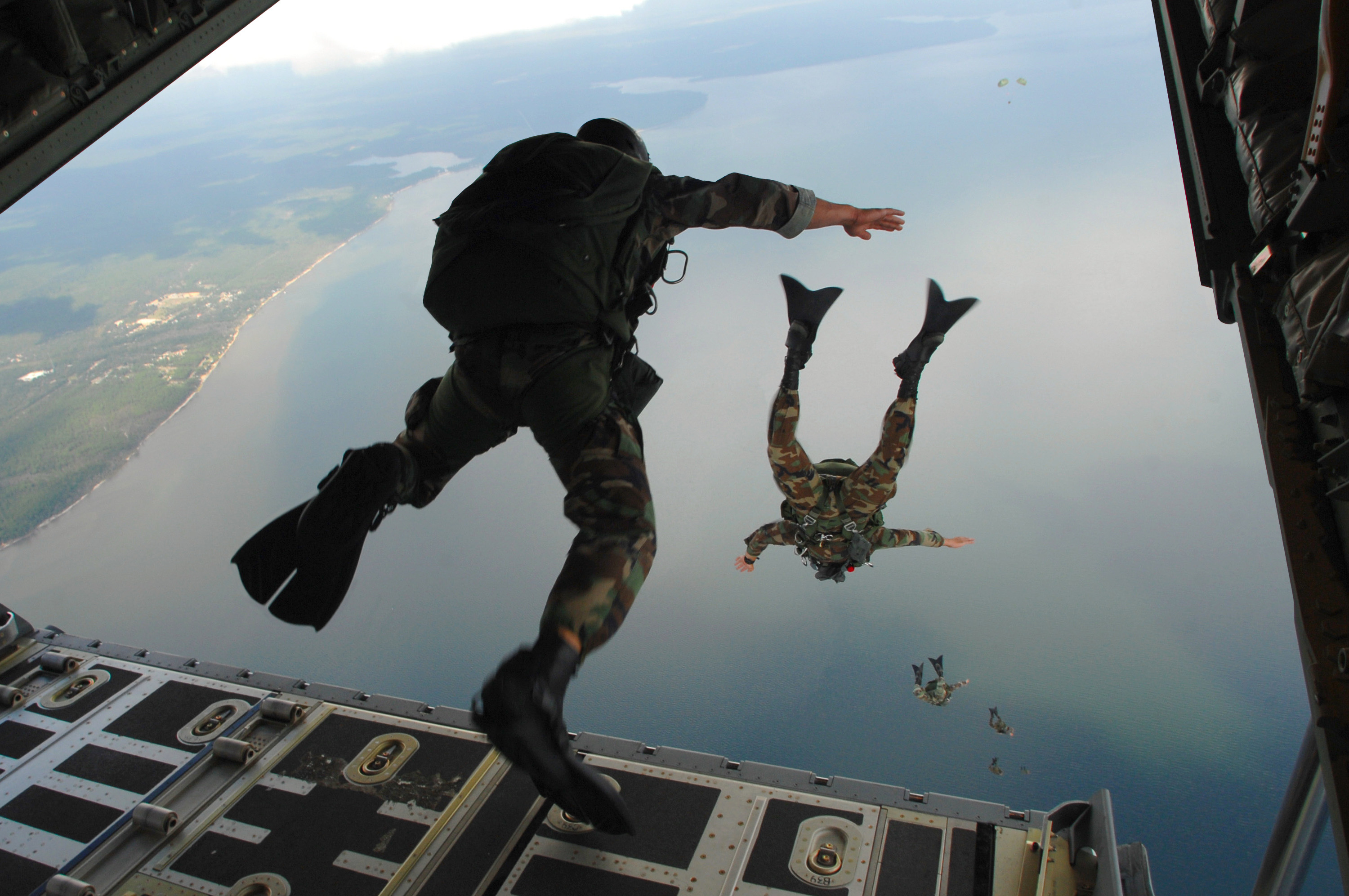
U.S. Air Force Airmen from the 720th Special Tactics Group out of Hurlburt Field, Fla., jump out of a C-130J Hercules aircraft during water rescue training above Choctawhatchee Bay, over the Destin coastline in Florida Oct. 3, 2007. The training is designed to enhance aerial ZoDIAC deployment and personnel recovery. The aircraft belongs to the 41st Airlift Squadron out of Little Rock Air Force Base in Arkansas.

The 'Blackcats' received their first C-130J on 13 March 2007, this marked the start of the squadron's replacement of their elderly C-130H Hercules transporters.

On 26 July 2019, the 41st Airlift Squadron was awarded the 2018 General Joseph Smith Trophy for being the most outstanding airlift squadron in Air Mobility Command for 2018. The squadron led the largest wing exercises in a decade, delivered the most prevalent overseas airdrop in five years, and had the Air Force's lowest C-130J mishap rate for eight years.

== Lineage ==
- Constituted as the 41st Transport Squadron on 2 February 1942

Activated on 18 February 1942
Redesignated 41st Troop Carrier Squadron on 4 July 1942
Redesignated 41st Troop Carrier Squadron, Heavy on 30 June 1948
Inactivated on 14 September 1949

- Redesignated 41st Troop Carrier Squadron, Medium on 3 July 1952

Activated on 14 July 1952
Redesignated 41st Troop Carrier Squadron on 8 December 1965
Redesignated 41st Tactical Airlift Squadron on 1 August 1967
Inactivated on 28 February 1971

- Activated on 31 August 1971

Redesignated 41st Airlift Squadron on 1 January 1992

=== Assignments ===
- San Antonio Air Depot, 18 February 1942
- 317th Transport Group (later 317th Troop Carrier Group), 22 February 1942 – 14 September 1949
- 317th Troop Carrier Group, 14 July 1952
- 317th Troop Carrier Wing, 12 March 1957
- 322d Air Division, 25 September 1958
- 317th Troop Carrier Wing, 15 April 1963 (attached to Detachment 1, 322d Air Division 6 September–21 December 1964)
- 315th Air Division, 21 November 1965 (attached to 6315 Operations Group)
- 374th Tactical Airlift Wing, 8 August 1966 – 28 February 1971
- 317th Tactical Airlift Wing, 31 August 1971

Attached to 513th Tactical Airlift Wing, 6 November 1971 – 12 January 1972, 11 March–16 May 1974, 11 November 1974 – 15 January 1975
Attached to 322d Tactical Airlift Wing, 4 June–16 August 1972, 5 February–14 April 1973, 9 August–15 October 1973
Attached to 435th Tactical Airlift Wing, 4 October–15 December 1975, 13 July–10 September 1976, 5 March–25 April 1977, 2 May–22 July 1978
Attached to 313th Tactical Airlift Wing, 5 December 1979 – 12 February 1980, 3 April–14 June 1981, 3 August–14 October 1982, 4 December 1983 – 15 February 1984, 10 February–10 April 1985, 25 May–13 August 1986, 1 August–14 October 1987, 3 December 1989 – 15 February 1992
Attached to Airlift Division, Provisional, 1610th, 1 November 1990; Tactical Airlift Wing, Provisional, 1660th, 17 December 1990; Tactical Airlift Group, Provisional, 1675th, 15 January–21 March 1991

- 317th Operations Group, 1 January 1992
- 23d Operations Group, 16 July 1993
- 43d Operations Group, 1 April 1997
- 463d Airlift Group, 5 April 2007
- 19th Operations Group, 1 October 2008 – present

=== Stations ===
- Duncan Field, Texas, 18 February 1942
- Bowman Field, Kentucky, 20 June 1942
- Laurinburg-Maxton Army Air Base, North Carolina, 3–12 December 1942
- Garbutt Field, Australia, 23 January 1943
- Port Moresby Airfield Complex, New Guinea, 5 October 1953
- Finschhafen Airfield, New Guinea, 24 April 1944
- Hollandia Airfield Complex, New Guinea, 13 May 1944
- Leyte, Philippines, 17 November 1944
- Clark Field, Luzon, Philippines, 6 March 1945
- Okinawa, August 1945
- Kimpo Air Base, South Korea, October 1945
- Seoul Air Base, South Korea, 7 January 1946
- Tachikawa Air Base, Japan, 19 January 1946
- Nagoya Air Base, Japan, 30 April 1947
- Tachikawa Air Base, Japan, September 1947– 22 September 1948
- Wiesbaden Air Base, Germany, 30 September 1948
- RAF Celle, Germany, 19 December 1948 – 14 September 1949
- Rhein-Main Air Base, Germany, 14 July 1952
- Neubiberg Air Base, Germany, 21 March 1953
- Évreux-Fauville Air Base, France, 15 March 1957 – 20 June 1964
- Lockbourne Air Force Base, Ohio, 20 June 1964 – 21 November 1965 (deployed to Évreux-Fauville Air Base, France 6 September-21 December 1964)
- Naha Air Base, Okinawa, 21 November 1965 – 28 February 1971
- Pope Air Force Base, North Carolina, 31 August 1971

Deployed to RAF Mildenhall, England, 6 November 1971 – 12 January 1972, 11 March-16 May 1974, 11 November 1974 – 15 January 1975, 13 July-10 September 1976, 5 March-25 April 1977, 2 May-22 July 1978, 5 December 1979 – 12 February 1980, 3 April-14 June 1981, 3 August-14 October 1982, 4 December 1983 – 15 February 1984, 10 February-10 April 1985, 25 May-13 August 1986, 1 August-14 October 1987, 3 December 1989 – 15 February 1990, 2 December 1991 – 15 February 1992
Deployed to Rhein-Main Air Base, Germany, 4 June-16 August 1972, 5 February-14 April 1973, 9 August-15 October 1973, 4 October-15 December 1975
Deployed to RAF Sculthorpe, England, 2 October-15 December 1988
Deployed to Thumrait Air Base, Oman, 11 August 1990 – 12 January 1991
Deployed to King Fahd Air Base, Saudi Arabia, 13 January-21 March 1991

- Little Rock Air Force Base, Arkansas, 5 April 2007 – present

=== Aircraft ===
- Douglas C-47 Skytrain (1942–1946)
- Curtiss C-46 Commando (1946–1948)
- Douglas C-54 Skymaster (1948–1949)
- Fairchild C-119 Flying Boxcar (1952–1958)
- Lockheed C-130 Hercules (1957–1971, 1971–2007)
- Lockheed C-130J Super Hercules (2007–present)
