= 46th Air Defense Missile Squadron =

46th Air Defense Missile Squadron (later 46th Tactical Missile Squadron)
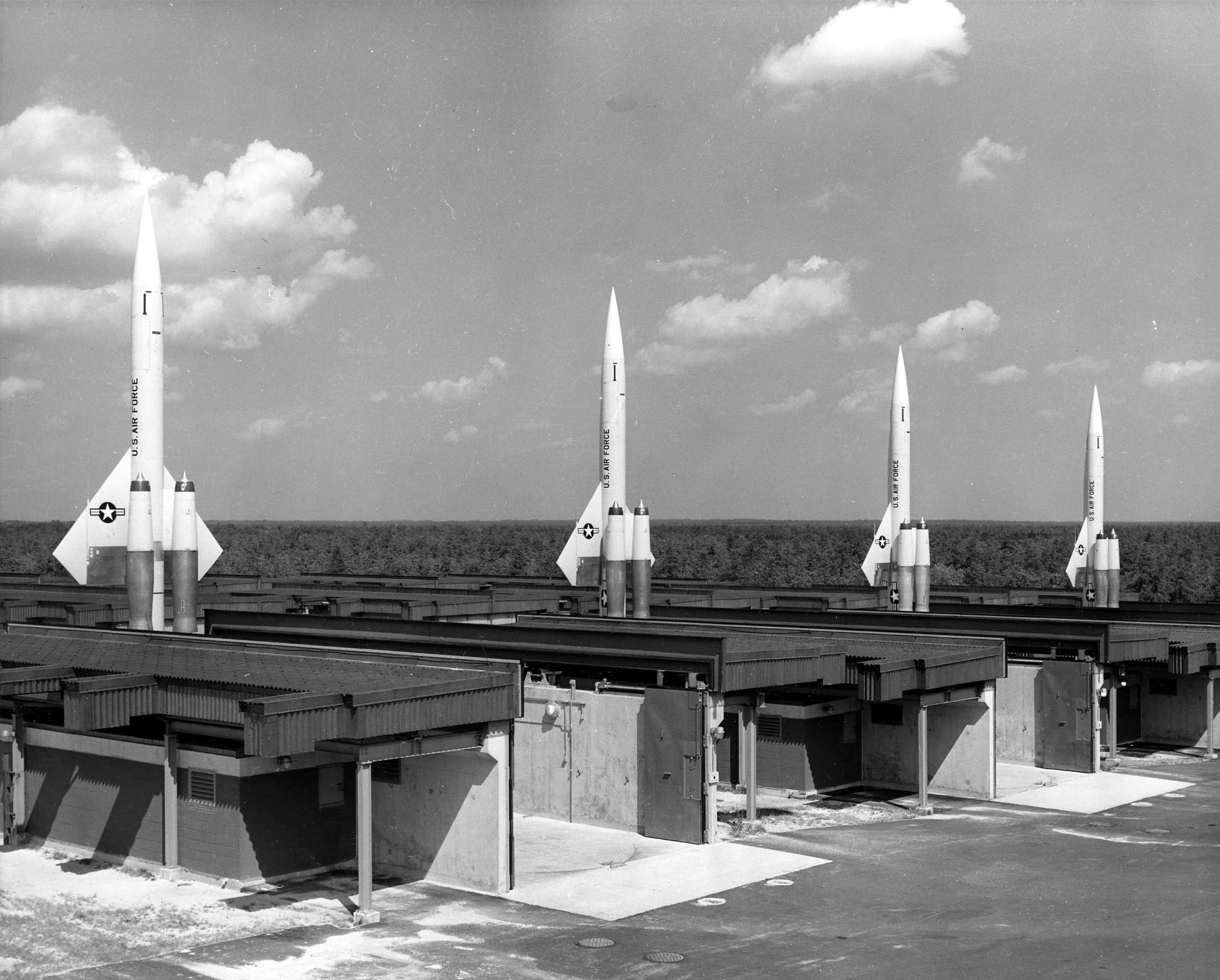
- 46th Air Defense Missile Squadron CIM-10 Bomarc missile battery
- Active: 1942-1949; 1959-1972
- Country: United States
- Branch: United States Air Force
- Role: Airlift, Air defense
- Size: squadron
- Mottos: The First and the Finest (1960-1972)
- Engagements: Southwest Pacific Theater
- Decorations: Distinguished Unit Citation; Philippine Presidential Unit Citation

Insignia
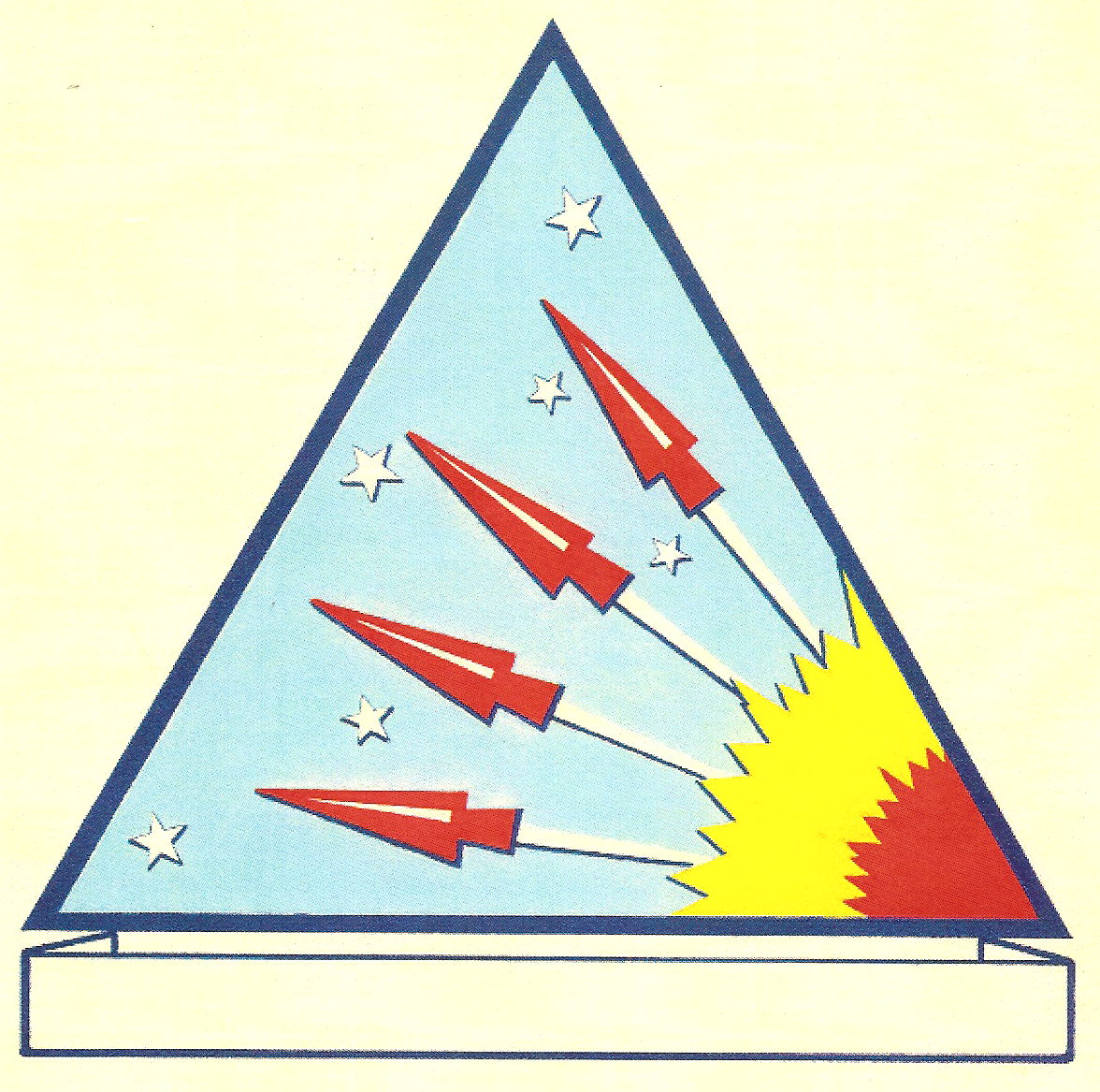
- 46th Air Defense Missile Squadron emblem (Note: Approved 5 May 1960. Description: On a light blue equilateral triangle, one point upwards, spattered with white stars, an Air Force golden yellow fire ball with a red center issuing from sinister (left) base from which four red missiles radiate to dexter (right), highlights and jet exhaust trails white; outlines and details AF blue throughout; all within a narrow Air Force blue border. Significance: Against a background of sky blue spattered with stars to represent the primary theater of operations, four red missiles (representing the four steps in air defense: detection, interception, identification, and destruction) issue from a fire ball, all representing the unit's overall mission, to equip, administer, and train assigned or attached personnel and provide a force in a maximum state of readiness for use in air defense. The three sides of the triangle symbolize the respective tasks performed by operations, materiel, and administration. The emblem bears the squadron colors, blue and golden yellow.)

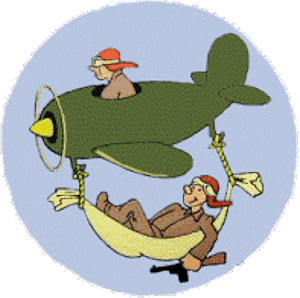
- 46th Troop Carrier Squadron emblem (Note: Approved 13 January 1943. Description: On a light blue disc, a green caricatured plane, propeller hub yellow, piloted by a caricatured figure, wearing tan flight suit, red helmet, white goggles, carrying a second caricatured figure attired as the first, suspended in a hammock by yellow rope from hooks at front and back underside of plane, grasping a 'tommy" gun proper.)

The 46th Air Defense Missile Squadron is an inactive United States Air Force unit, consolidated in September 1985 as the 46th Tactical Missile Squadron.

The squadron's first predecessor was organized in May 1942 as the 46th Troop Carrier Squadron. After training in the United States, it deployed to the Southwest Pacific Theater, where it engaged in combat, earning two Distinguished Unit Citations and a Philippine Presidential Unit Citation for its actions. Following V-J Day, it deployed to Japan, serving as part of the occupation forces until inactivating in 1949.

The second predecessor unit was activated in January 1959 as the 46th Air Defense Missile Squadron. It served at McGuire Air Force Base, New Jersey as part of the air defenses of the northeastern United States with BOMARC missiles until inactivating in October 1972.

== History ==
=== Airlift Operations ===
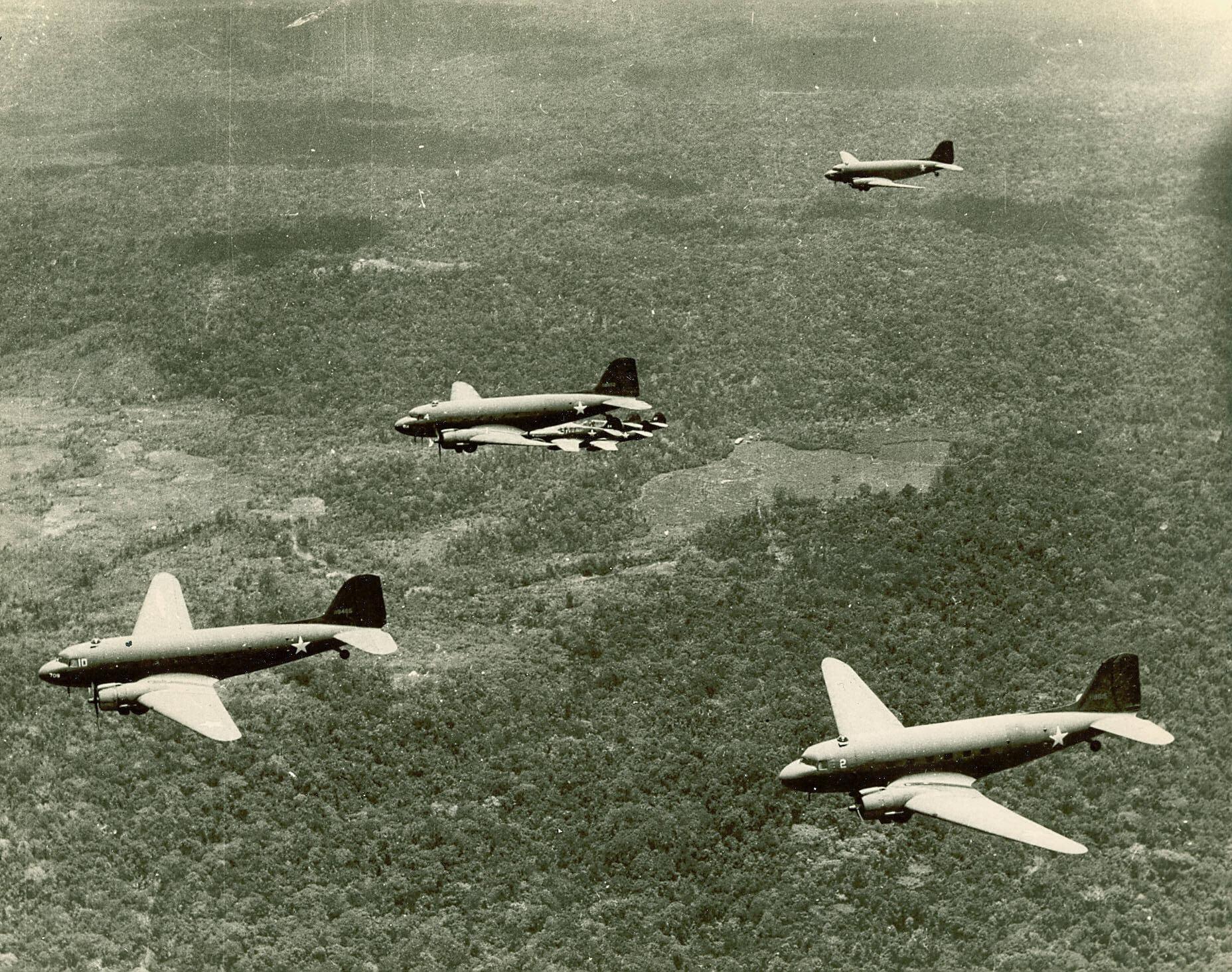
C-47s delivering supplies in New Guinea

The squadron was first activated under the 317th Transport Group (later 317th Troop Carrier Group), an element of Air Transport Command (later I Troop Carrier Command) in May 1942 as the group expanded from three to four squadrons. The group and squadron equipped with Douglas C-47 Skytrains and trained at several airfields in Texas, the midwest and the southeast. It also performed various airlift missions as part of its training. The squadron deployed to Australia, arriving in January 1943 as an element of Fifth Air Force. It made numerous flights in unarmed planes over the Owen Stanley Range transporting reinforcement and supplies to Wau, Papua New Guinea, where enemy forces were threatening a valuable Allied airdrome, for which it was awarded a Distinguished Unit Citation. It performed paratroop drops at Nadzab (the first airborne operation in the Southwest Pacific) and Noemfoor in New Guinea; Tagaytay, Luzon, and Corregidor and Aparri in the Philippines. Also performed cargo airlift, supply and evacuation, and other assigned missions along the northern coast of New Guinea; the Dutch East Indies and in the Philippines as part of MacArthur's island hopping offensive against the Japanese in the Southwest Pacific. This included supplying guerillas in Mindanao, Cebu, and Panay. In April 1945, it bombed Carabao Island with drums of napalm.

The squadron deployed to Okinawa in August 1945 after the Japanese capitulation and became part of the American occupation forces. It replaced its C-47s with longer range Curtiss C-46 Commando aircraft and moved to Japan and the Korean peninsula during late 1945. Its initial post-war missions included the evacuation of former Allied prisoners of war; later primarily cargo transport missions in the occupied areas of Japan and Korea during the postwar era. The squadron inactivated in 1949 in Japan due to budget constraints; its aircraft being assigned to other units as part of the consolidation.

=== Cold War Air Defense ===
The squadron was activated as the 46th Air Defense Missile Squadron (BOMARC) in 1959 at McGuire Air Force Base, New Jersey, and stood alert during the Cold War, with IM-99A (later CIM-10) BOMARC surface to air antiaircraft missiles starting in September 1959. The squadron was tied into a Semi-Automatic Ground Environment (SAGE) direction center which could use analog computers to process information from ground radars, picket ships and airborne aircraft to accelerate the display of tracking data at the direction center to quickly direct the missile site to engage hostile aircraft.

On 7 June 1960, a Bomarc and its Mark 40 nuclear warhead was destroyed by fire caused by an exploding helium tank that scattered fragments in all directions. Part of the response to this incident was to reduce the pressure on the tanks. Until a permanent fix was devised a year later, this removed all Bomarcs from alert, since it would take hours to bring the tanks up to operating pressure.

In October 1962, the squadron upgraded to the CIM-10B model of the Bomarc. The BOMARC B had a solid fuel booster, longer range and a higher maximum altitude than the BOMARC A.

It trained personnel and prepared for operation of the BOMARC surface-to-air missiles; operated and maintained BOMARC missiles and associated equipment, trained personnel, and maintained a capability to intercept and destroy hostile aircraft until 1 October 1972. The squadron was inactivated on 31 October 1972, one of the last two BOMARC missile squadrons inactivated.

The BOMARC missile site was located 4 miles (6.4 km) east-southeast of McGuire Air Force Base at 40°02′06″N 074°26′29″W. Although geographically separated from the base, it was an off base facility of McGuire and the squadron received administrative and logistical support from McGuire.

=== Consolidation ===
The 46th Troop Carrier Squadron and the 46th Air Defense Missile Squadron were consolidated on 19 September 1985 as the 46th Tactical Missile Squadron while remaining inactive.

== Lineage ==
46th Troop Carrier Squadron

- Constituted as the 46th Transport Squadron on 30 May 1942

Activated on 15 June 1942
Redesignated as the 46th Troop Carrier Squadron on 4 July 1942
Redesignated as the 46th Troop Carrier Squadron, Medium on 10 August 1948
Inactivated on 1 April 1949

- Consolidated with the 46 Air Defense Missile Squadron on 19 September 1985

46th Air Defense Missile Squadron

Constituted as the 46th Air Defense Missile Squadron (BOMARC) on 10 December 1958
Activated on 1 January 1959
Inactivated on 31 October 1972

- Consolidated with the 46 Troop Carrier Squadron on 19 September 1985

=== Assignments ===
- 317th Transport Group (later 317th Troop Carrier Group), 15 June 1942
- Fifth Air Force, 18 August 1948 – 1 April 1949 (attached to 317th Troop Carrier Wing), 18 August 1948, 6146th Station Group, 1 October 1948, 374th Troop Carrier Group, 5 March 1949 - 1 April 1949
- New York Air Defense Sector, 1 January 1959
- 21st Air Division, 1 April 1966
- 35th Air Division, 1 December 1967 – 1 October 1972

=== Stations ===
- Duncan Field, Texas, 15 June 1942
- Bowman Field, Kentucky, 19 June 1942;
- Lawson Field, Georgia, 10 October 1942
- Laurinburg-Maxton Airport, North Carolina, 3–12 December 1942
- Garbutt Field, Australia, 23 January 1943
- Port Moresby Airfield Complex, Papua New Guinea, 1 October 1943
- Finschhafen Airfield, Papua New Guinea, 19 April 1944
- Hollandia Airfield Complex, New Guinea, 5 July 1944
- Tanauan Airfield, Leyte, Philippines, 19 November 1944
- Clark Field, Luzon, Philippines, March 1945
- Kadena Airfield, Okinawa, 19 August 1945
- Seoul Airport, Korea, 19 October 1945
- Tachikawa Airfield, Japan, 19 January 1946
- Kimpo Airfield, Korea, 10 July 1946
- Matsushima Air Field, Japan, 1 August 1948
- Tachikawa Air Base, Japan, 1 October 1948 – 1 April 1949
- McGuire Air Force Base, New Jersey, 1 January 1959 – 1 October 1972

=== Awards and campaigns ===
Award streamer	Award	Dates	Notes
	Distinguished Unit Citation	30 January 1943-1 February 1943	46th Troop Carrier Squadron, Papua New Guinea
	Distinguished Unit Citation	16 February 1945-17 February 1945	46th Troop Carrier Squadron, Philippine Islands
	Philippine Republic Presidential Unit Citation	19 November 1944-4 July 1945	46th Troop Carrier Squadron

Campaign Streamer	Campaign	Dates	Notes
	Papua	23 January 1943	46th Troop Carrier Squadron
	New Guinea	24 January 1943 – 31 December 1944	46th Troop Carrier Squadron
	Northern Solomons	23 February 1943 – 21 November 1944	46th Troop Carrier Squadron
	Bismarck Archipelago	15 December 1943 – 27 November 1944	46th Troop Carrier Squadron
	Leyte	17 October 1944 – 1 July 1945	46th Troop Carrier Squadron
	Luzon	15 December 1944 – 4 July 1945	46th Troop Carrier Squadron
	Southern Philippines	27 February 1945 – 4 July 1945	46th Troop Carrier Squadron
	World War II Army of Occupation (Japan)	3 September 1945 – 1 April 1949	46th Troop Carrier Squadron

=== Aircraft and missiles ===
- Douglas C-47 Skytrain, 1942–1945
- Curtiss C-46 Commando, 1945–1949
- Boeing IM-99 (later CIM-10) BOMARC, 1959-1972

== See also ==
- List of United States Air Force missile squadrons
- List of Douglas C-47 Skytrain operators
- BOMARC missile accident site
