= 317th Airlift Wing =

317th Airlift Wing

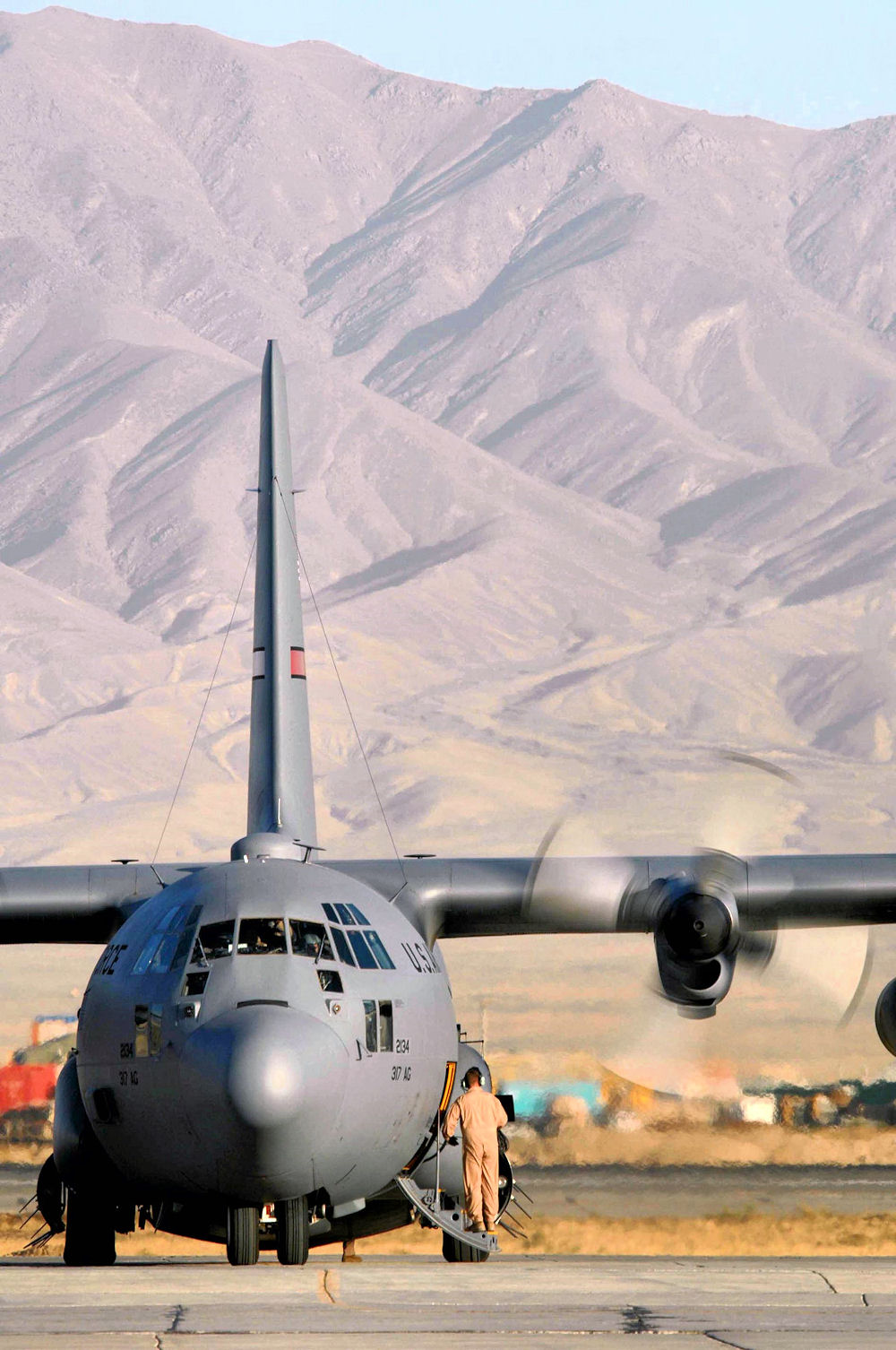
- A C-130 Hercules from the 317th Airlift Group prepares to take off from Bagram Air Base in support of Operation Enduring Freedom
- Active: 1948–1949; 1952–1993; 1997–present
- Country: United States
- Branch: United States Air Force
- Role: Airlift
- Part of: Air Mobility Command; 18th Air Force
- Garrison/HQ: Dyess Air Force Base
- Motto: "I Gain By Hazard"
- Equipment: C-130 Hercules
- Decorations: Air Force Meritorious Unit Award Air Force Outstanding Unit Award

Commanders
- Current commander: Col. Christopher M. Welch
- Vice commander: Col. Matthew W. MacFarlane
- Command Chief: CMSgt CMSgt Brian Castillo

Insignia
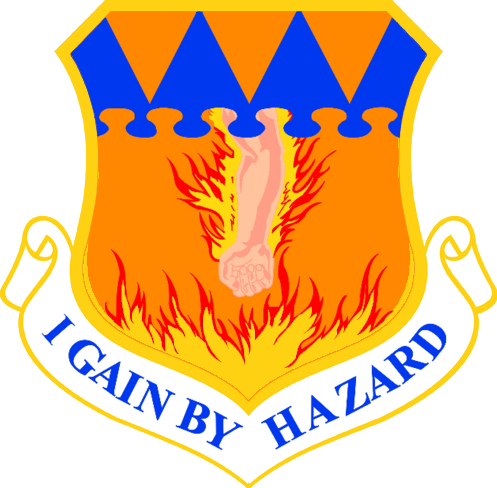
- 317th Airlift Group emblem (Note: Approved 15 May 1958.)

The 317th Airlift Wing is a United States Air Force unit, stationed at Dyess Air Force Base, Texas. Assigned to Air Mobility Command (AMC) Eighteenth Air Force, the wing is a tenant unit at Dyess Air Force Base, an installation under the control of the 7th Bomb Wing of the Air Force Global Strike Command.

Previously designated the 317th Airlift Group, the unit was redesignated as a wing on 6 July 2017.

The 317th is an airlift organization, flying the Lockheed Martin C-130J Super Hercules. Since December 2003, the 317th has been in a continuously deployed status in support of the global war on terrorism, with elements being deployed into combat areas. It has been engaged in Operation Enduring Freedom and Operation Iraqi Freedom, as well as supporting other air expeditionary units around the world.

== Units ==
The 317th Airlift Wing is composed of the following groups and squadrons:

- 317th Operations Group
  - 39th Airlift Squadron "Trail Blazers" (C-130J)
  - 40th Airlift Squadron "Screaming Eagles" (C-130J)
  - 317th Operations Support Squadron "Warbirds"
- 317th Maintenance Group
  - 317th Maintenance Squadron
  - 317th Aircraft Maintenance Squadron

== History ==
=== Cold War ===
317th Troop Carrier Wing was activated in Japan in 1948. Provided troop carrier and courier service in the Far East, 1948. As a result of Soviet blockade of Berlin, moved by ship from Japan to West Germany, December 1948— January 1949 and reassigned to USAFE.. Participated in Berlin Airlift, 9 January – 31 July 1949.

Became USAFE theater airlift organization. From July 1952 to April 1957 provided C-119 troop carrier and airlift service in support of USAFE, NATO, and UN, at same time participating in numerous exercises and humanitarian missions. Moved to France in April 1957, replacing 465th Troop Carrier Wing on 8 July From April 1963 to June 1964, provided C-130 airlift in support of USAFE, NATO, and UN.

Reassigned to Tactical Air Command and moved to Ohio in June 1964. Became involved in TAC's worldwide C-130 airlift operations, with airborne training a major responsibility.

In May 1967 the unit was redesignated the 317th Tactical Airlift Wing and by 1971 it transferred to Pope Air Force Base, North Carolina. Provided C-130 replacement training support for PACAF, October 1965— July 1971 and August— December 1971. Also provided C-123 combat crew training for the U.S. and Republic of Vietnam crews, September 1969— August 1971.

Reassigned to Military Airlift Command in December 1974. Pioneered in use of adverse weather aerial delivery system (AWADS) equipment in active combat operations in Southeast Asia, and from September 1977 to January 1988, trained aircrews in the AWADS for a C-130 squadron in Europe.

The 317th provided airlift, combat control, medical evacuation, and security police support for Operation Urgent Fury, the rescue and evacuation of American citizens from Grenada, October–November 1983.

Between 1983 and 1993, the 317th participated in training exercises, special assignment airlift missions, channel missions for Military Airlift Command and Air Mobility Command, and national airlift competitions. Crews and aircraft of assigned squadrons rotated periodically to England for European providing intra-theater airlift. It has Trained jointly with Army airborne forces from Fort Bragg, North Carolina, tested container delivery system for parachute dropping of heavy equipment, deployed crews and aircraft worldwide as needed, and led C-130 Airborne Assault of Rio Hato for the Rangers and provided launch support out of Green Ramp at Pope Air Force Base for 2126 82nd Airborne Division paratroopers on C-141s and follow on support airlift for airborne and special operations forces in Operation Just Cause in Panama.

=== Post Cold War era ===
After an Iraqi invasion of Kuwait in 1990, transported troops, equipment, and supplies to Southwest Asia as part of Operation Desert Shield and participated in Operation Desert Storm in 1991. In 1992, the Fighting 3-1-7 took part in humanitarian airlifts to Bosnia (Operation Provide Promise) and Somalia (Operation Provide Relief). It transported relief workers and supplies to Florida after Hurricane Andrew. As the Air Force continued to streamline its operations after the end of the Cold War, the 317th was inactivated at Pope Air Force Base in July 1993.

Four years after the inactivation, in April 1997, a transfer of all U.S. based C-130 aircraft to Air Mobility Command resulted in the reactivation of the 317th as a group organization. From 1997 to present, deployed personnel and equipment worldwide to provide all phases of combat delivery, air-land, airdrop, airlift maintenance and recovery, operations support and deployable air mobility command and control.

In 2008, the 317th again supported Americans providing hurricane relief in Hurricanes Gustav and Ike, transporting patients and ambulatory personnel away from affected areas to temporary shelters.

Beginning 20 December 2003 and ending 20 March 2013, the 317th deployed for 3,378 continuous days in service to the United States at home and abroad.

On 25 July 2013, the group received its 28th and final Lockheed Martin C-130J Super Hercules, giving the group the distinction of being the largest C-130J unit in the world.

In May 2014, crews and planes of the group deployed to Camp Lemonnier, Djibouti, where they formed the 75th Expeditionary Airlift Squadron, supporting Combined Joint Task Force – Horn of Africa. During the deployment crews supported medical evacuations, disaster relief, humanitarian and airdrop operations. Operations included movement of the East Africa Response Force to forward positions.

On 19 February 2015, airmen of the 317th who had been deployed to Dakar, Senegal as part of Operation United Assistance, the US military support to the Agency for International Development in its response to contain the outbreak of the Ebola virus in West Africa. The return of these airmen marked the first time since September 2013 that the entire group was together at its home station. At Dakar, the airmen had served as part of the 787th Air Expeditionary Squadron.

In July 2017, the unit was upgraded to wing status with the oncurrent establishment of the 317th Operations Group and 317th Maintenance Group.

== Lineage ==
- Established as the 317th Troop Carrier Wing, on 10 August 1948

Activated on 18 August 1948
Inactivated on 14 September 1949
Redesignated 317th Troop Carrier WingMedium on 3 July 1952
Activated on 14 July 1952
Inactivated on 25 September 1958

- Activated on 13 March 1963 (not organized)

Organized on 15 April 1963
Redesignated: 317th Troop Carrier Wing on 1 March 1966
Redesignated: 317th Tactical Airlift Wing on 1 May 1967
Redesignated: 317th Airlift Wing on 1 January 1992
Inactivated on 18 August 1993

- Redesignated 317th Airlift Group on 31 March 1997

Activated on 1 April 1997

- Redesignated 317th Airlift Wing on 6 July 2017

=== Assignments ===
- Fifth Air Force, 18 August 1948
- 1st Air Lift Task Force, 8 January – 14 September 1949
- Twelfth Air Force, 14 July 1952 (attached to 322d Air Division [Combat Cargo] after 1 April 1954)
- 322d Air Division (Combat Cargo), 1 August 1955 – 25 September 1958
- United States Air Forces in Europe, 13 March 1963
- 322d Air Division (Combat Cargo), 15 April 1963
- United States Air Forces in Europe, 1 April 1964 (attached to 322d Air Division [Combat Cargo])
- Ninth Air Force, 20 June 1964
- 840th Air Division, 1 October 1964
- Ninth Air Force, 24 December 1969
- 839th Air Division, 31 March 1970
- Twenty-First Air Force, 31 December 1974 (attached to Operating Location A, Headquarters Twenty-First Air Force until 30 June 1975)
- Fifteenth Air Force, 1 April 1997
- Eighteenth Air Force, 1 October 2003 – present

=== Components ===
Group

- 317th Troop Carrier Group (later 317th Tactical Airlift, 317th Operations Group): 18 August 1948 – 14 September 1949 (attached to 7480th Air Force Wing 21 September 1948 – 8 January 1949; not operational after c. 31 August 1949); 14 July 1952 – 12 March 1957 (not operational after 8 May 1955), 15 September 1978 – 1 April 1980; 1 January 1992 – 16 July 1993

Squadrons

- 18th Troop Carrier Squadron: 1 April 1965 – 25 June 1967
- 37th Tactical Airlift Squadron: 15 September 1975 – 1 October 1977
- 39th Troop Carrier Squadron (later 39th Tactical Airlift Squadron, 39th Airlift Squadron): attached 8 May 1955 – 23 June 1956; assigned 8 July 1957 – 25 September 1958; 15 April 1963 – 31 July 1971 (detached c. February—c. May 1965, 13 May – 18 July 1968 and 15 April – 22 July 1969; not operational, 1 June – 31 July 1971); 31 August 1971 – 15 September 1978 (detached 12 December 1973 – 17 February 1974, 9 July – 15 September 1974, 12 July – 14 September 1975, 12 April – 14 June 1976, 4 January – 4 March 1977); 1 April 1980 – 1 January 1992 (detached 8 October – 13 December 1980, 3 February – 14 April 1982, 4 June – 13 August 1983, 1 October – 12 December 1984, 2 February – 15 April 1986, 3 March – 15 May 1987, 3 June – 10 August 1988, 6 August – 10 October 1989, 1 June – 9 July 1991); 1 April 1997 – present
- 40th Troop Carrier Squadron (later 40th Tactical Airlift Squadron, 40th Airlift Squadron: attached 21 September – 15 November 1948; attached 8 May 1955 – 11 March 1957, assigned 12 March 1957 – 25 September 1958 (detached 10 April – 7 July 1957); 15 April 1963 – 15 September 1978 (detached 24 November 1964 – 19 February 1965, 16 March – 26 May 1968; not operational, 12 – 30 August 1971; detached 31 August – 17 October 1971, 7 April – 16 June 1973, 4 March – 7 May 1975, 12 January – 15 March 1976, 4 October – 15 December 1976, and 26 April – 15 July 1977) 1 April 1980 – 1 January 1992 (detached 7 June – 8 August 1980, 3 October – 16 December 1981, 3 February – 14 April 1983, 7 April – 17 June 1984, 4 August – 16 October 1985, 5 October – 10 December 1986, 20 November 1987 – 10 February 1988, 4 February – 12 April 1989, 31 March – 9 April 1990, 9 July – 10 August 1991); 1 April 1997 – present
- 41st Troop Carrier Squadron (later 41st Tactical Airlift Squadron, 41st Airlift Squadron: attached 8 May 1955 – 11 March 1957, assigned 12 March 1957 – 25 September 1958 (detached 15 March – 7 July 1957); assigned 15 April 1963 – 21 November 1965 (detached 6 September – 21 December 1964); 31 August 1971 – 15 September 1978 (detached 6 November 1971 – 12 January 1972, 4 June – 16 August 1972, 5 February – 14 April 1973, 9 August – 15 October 1973, 11 March – 16 May 1974, 11 November 1974 – 15 January 1975, 4 October – 15 December 1975, 13 July – 10 September 1976, and 5 March – 25 April 1977) 1 April 1980 – 1 January 1992 (detached 3 April – 14 June 1981, 3 August – 14 October 1982, 4 December 1983 – 15 February 1984, 10 February – 10 April 1985, 25 May – 13 August 1986, 1 August – 14 October 1987, 2 October – 15 December 1988, 3 December 1989 – 15 February 1990
- 46th Troop Carrier Squadron: attached 18 August – 30 September 1948
- 52d Troop Carrier Squadron: attached 15 April 1963 – 31 March 1964
- 780th Troop Carrier Squadron: 8 July 1957 – 8 March 1958
- 781st Troop Carrier Squadron: 8 July 1957 – 8 March 1958
- 782d Troop Carrier Squadron: 8 July – 20 December 1957
- 4408th Combat Crew Training Squadron: 22 September 1969 – 15 August 1971

=== Stations ===
- Tachikawa Airfield, Japan, 18 August 1948 – c. 21 September 1948
- Wiesbaden Air Base, Germany, c. 30 September 1948
- Celle RAF Station, Germany (later: West Germany), 9 January – 14 September 1949
- Rhein-Main Air Base, West Germany, 14 July 1952
- Neubiberg Air Base, West Germany, 17 March 1953
- Évreux-Fauville Air Base, France, 17 April 1957 – 25 September 1958; 15 April 1963 – 20 June 1964
- Lockbourne Air Force Base, Ohio, 20 June 1964
- Pope Air Force Base, North Carolina, 31 August 1971 – 20 August 1993
- Dyess Air Force Base, Texas, 1 April 1997 – present

=== Aircraft ===
- C-47 Skytrain, 1942–1948
- C-46 Commando, 1948
- C-54 Skymaster, 1948–1949
- C-119 Flying Boxcar, 1952–1957, 1957–1958
- C-130 Hercules, 1957–1958, 1963–1964, 1964–1971, 1971–1993, 1997–2012
- C-124 Globemaster II, 1963–1964
- C-123 Provider, 1969–1971.
- Lockheed Martin C-130J Super Hercules, 2010–present

== See also ==
- United States Army Air Forces in Australia
- Bakers Creek air crash
