= 781st Bombardment Squadron =

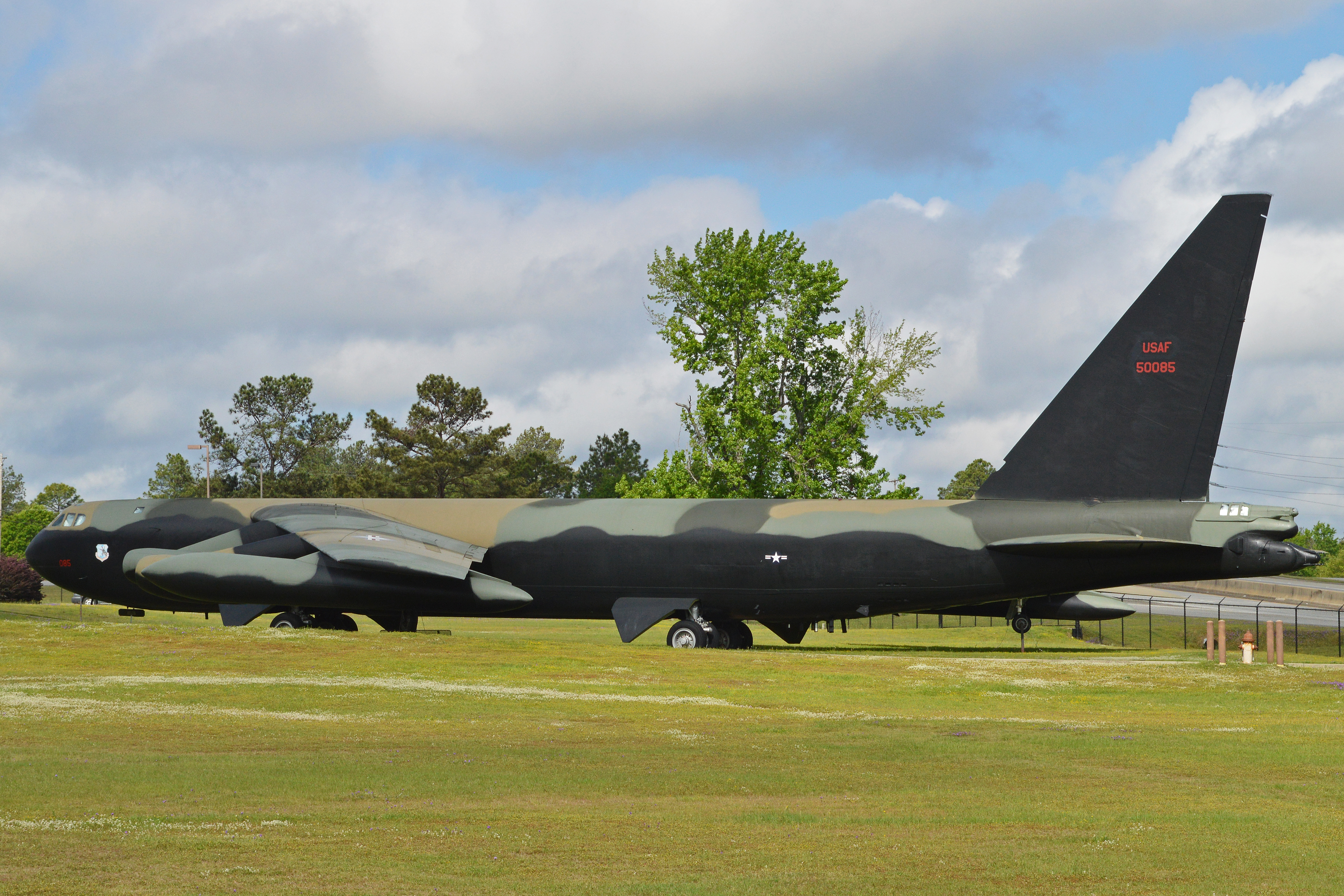
- B-52D Stratofortress on display at Robins AFB (Note: Aircraft is Boeing B-52D-55-BO Stratofortress, serial 55-085. Baugher, Joe (16 May 2023). "1955 USAF Serial Numbers". Joe Baugher.)
- Active: 1943–1945; 1953–1958; 1963–1968
- Country: United States
- Branch: United States Air Force
- Role: Bombardment
- Part of: Strategic Air Command
- Mottos: Unitas-Virtus-Effecta (Latin for 'Unity, Strength and Effectiveness')
- Engagements: Mediterranean Theater of Operations
- Decorations: Distinguished Unit Citation; Air Force Outstanding Unit Award

Insignia
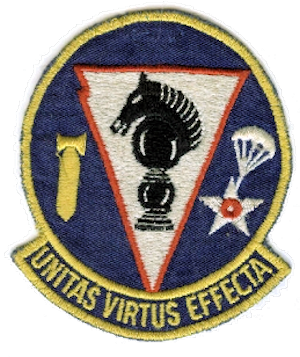
- 781st Bombardment Squadron emblem (Strategic Air Command)

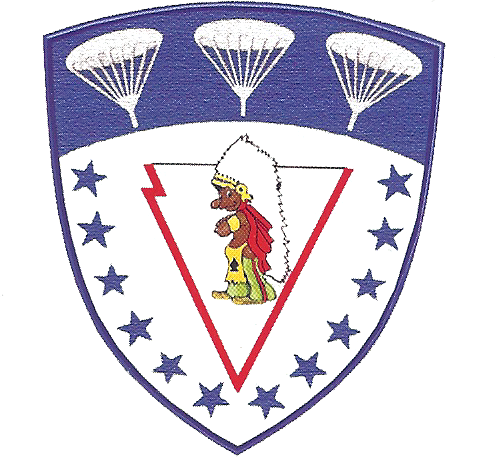
- 781st Troop Carrier Squadron emblem (Note: Approved c. 1953 Description: On a shield white, edged Air Force blue, over and through a white arrow, point to base, drop shadow light red, a caricatured Indian proper, standing with arms folded, wearing yellow and white headdress, red cloak, yellow breechcloth with a black spade in the center; light green trousers striped red, and yellow shoes, flanked with twelve Air Force blue stars on a chief arched of the last [color mentioned], three parachutes of the field [color].)

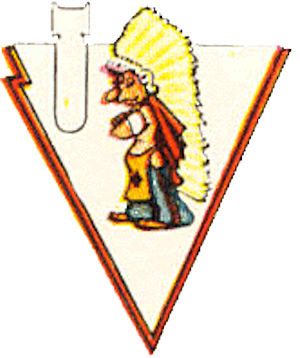
- 781st Bombardment Squadron emblem (World War II)

The 781st Bombardment Squadron is an inactive United States Air Force unit. Its last assignment was to the 465th Bombardment Wing, stationed at Robins Air Force Base, Georgia. It was inactivated on 25 July 1968.

The squadron was first activated in 1943 as the 781st Bombardment Squadron. It served in combat in the Mediterranean Theater of Operations as a Consolidated B-24 Liberator unit, earning two Distinguished Unit Citations for its actions. After V-E Day, the squadron served in Air Transport Command, ferrying men from the combat theater back to the United States.

The squadron was activated again as the 781st Troop Carrier Squadron in 1953, when it replaced a reserve squadron that had been mobilized for the Korean War. It moved to France, where it provided theater airlift until inactivating in 1958. The squadron returned to its earlier designation in 1963, when it replaced another B-52 unit at Robins. It was inactivated when it transferred it mission and personnel to another squadron in 1968.

== History ==
=== World War II ===
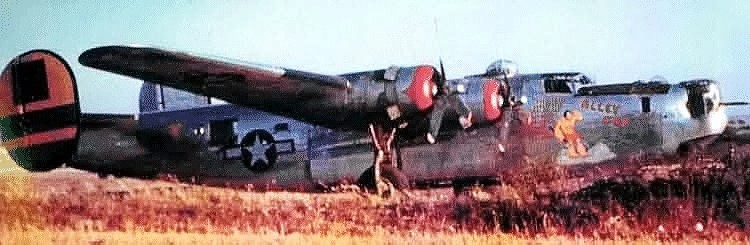
465th Bomb Group B-24H at Pantanella (Note: Aircraft is Consolidated B-24H-15-CF Liberator, serial 41-29347, Alley Oop. This plane was lost on 28 July 1944, on a mission over Yugoslavia. Baugher, Joe (18 April 2023). "1941 USAF Serial Numbers". Joe Baugher., Missing Air Crew Report 7106.)

The squadron was first activated at Alamogordo Army Air Field, New Mexico as the 781st Bombardment Squadron, one of the four original Consolidated B-24 Liberator heavy bomber squadrons of the 465th Bombardment Group. After training under Second Air Force, the squadron deployed to the Mediterranean Theater of Operations in February 1944.

The squadron arrived in the Mediterranean Theater of Operations, where it was stationed at Pantanella Airfield, Italy in March 1944. The air echelon halted in Tunisia for additional training before completing its move to Italy, where it became part of Fifteenth Air Force. It flew strategic bombardment combat missions over France, Germany, Italy, Austria and the Balkans, attacking targets such as marshalling yards, docks, aircraft factories and oil production facilities. On 8 July 1944 the squadron attacked an oil refinery and marshalling yards near Vienna, Austria despite heavy flak and fighter opposition, earning the unit a Distinguished Unit Citation. It was awarded a second citation for an attack on 3 August 1944 against a steel plant in Friedrichshafen, Germany.

The squadron was occasionally diverted from the strategic campaign. It attacked troop concentrations in May 1944 to assist partisan forces in Yugoslavia and performed interdiction missions to support the advance on Rome. Prior to Operation Dragoon, the invasion of southern France, it attacked bridges, railroads and gun emplacements near the landing area. It supported Red Army and Romanian Army forces advancing in the Balkans in October 1944 and Operation Grapeshot, the advance of Allied forces in Northern Italy in April 1945.

The squadron moved to Waller Field, Trinidad and became part of Air Transport Command in June 1945. It used its Liberators as transports, flying personnel from Trinidad to Florida. The unit was inactivated in Trinidad during July 1945. The squadron was redesignated as very heavy bomber squadron in 1945, but remained inactive.

=== European airlift ===
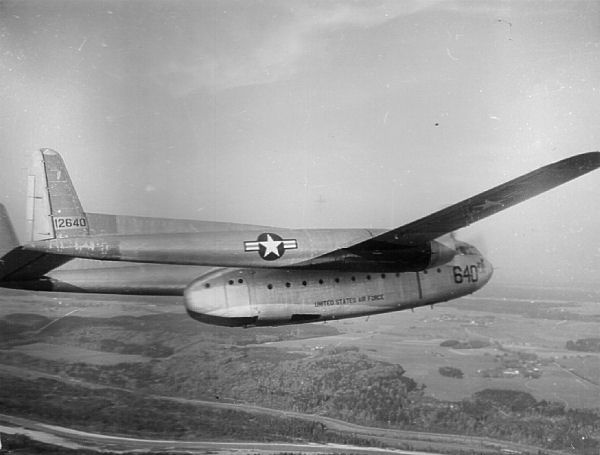
781st C-119C over Toul (Note: Aircraft is Fairchild C 119C-26-FA, serial 51-2640, taken in 1954.)

In February 1953, Tactical Air Command activated the 465th Troop Carrier Group at Donaldson Air Force Base, South Carolina to replace the 433d Troop Carrier Group, a reserve unit that had been mobilized for the Korean War. The squadron was redesignated the 781st Troop Carrier Squadron and assumed the personnel, mission and aircraft of the 310th Troop Carrier Squadron, which was simultaneously inactivated. At the time it was replaced by the 465th, the 443d Group was in the process of converting to the Fairchild C-119 Flying Boxcar from the Curtiss C-46 Commando it was flying when mobilized.

The squadron's intended base at Évreux-Fauville Air Base, France was still under construction, so in December, the 465th Group moved to Toul-Rosières Air Base, France. In November the squadron's ground echelon sailed on the USS General Alexander M. Patch, while the air echelon departed Donaldson with their C-119s at the beginning of December. Although construction at Toul had progressed, it could only accommodate a single flying squadron, and the 781st located at Wiesbaden Air Base, Germany. By April 1954, construction at Toul was advanced enough that the squadron's parent 465th Troop Carrier Wing could join it (Note: The 465th Wing and Group had been operating separately since their activation in February 1953. Maurer, Combat Squadrons, pp. 340-341; Ravenstein, Combat Wings, pp. 260-261.) and the 781st relocated to Toul on 1 May. The squadron participated in airlift operations, tests and exercises in Europe. Although the squadron mission was troop carrier, there were few American airborne troops in Europe, and it focused on theater airlift flights, particularly supporting fighter units deploying to Wheelus Air Base for training at the ranges there.

In December 1956, the 465th Group became non-operational, in preparation for the 465th Wing reorganization under the dual deputy model. Until March 1957, when the new organization became effective, the squadron was attached to wing headquarters. The 465th Group was inactivated in March and the 781st was reassigned directly to the 465th Wing. Four months later, the 465th Wing inactivated and transferred its operational squadrons to the 317th Troop Carrier Wing, which had moved to Évreux-Fauville Air Base from its former station at Neubiberg Air Base, Germany. The squadron began conversion to the Lockheed C-130 Hercules, but was inactivated in March 1958.

=== Strategic Air Command ===
Strategic Air Command (SAC) had established the 4137th Strategic Wing at Robins Air Force Base, Georgia as part of SAC's plan to disperse its Boeing B-52 Stratofortress heavy bombers over a larger number of bases, thus making it more difficult for the Soviet Union to knock out the entire fleet with a surprise first strike. In 1962, in order to perpetuate the lineage of many currently inactive bombardment units with illustrious World War II records, Headquarters SAC received authority from Headquarters USAF to discontinue its Major Command controlled (MAJCON) strategic wings that were equipped with combat aircraft and to activate Air Force controlled (AFCON) units, which could carry on a lineage and history. (Note: MAJCON units could not carry a permanent history or lineage. Ravenstein, A Guide to Air Force Lineage and Honors, p. 12.)

As a result, the 4137th was replaced by the 465 Bombardment Wing, and on 1 February 1963, the 781st, returning to its World War II designation of 781st Bombardment Squadron, took over the mission, personnel and equipment of the 342d Bombardment Squadron, which was simultaneously inactivated. (Note: In this reorganization, "the bombardment squadrons that had been assigned to the strategic wings were inactivated and bombardment squadrons that had previously been assigned to the newly-activated wings were activated. While these actions were almost tantamount to redesignation, they were not official redesignations." The Development of the Strategic Air Command 1946-1986, Office of the Historian, Headquarters Strategic Air Command, Offutt AFB, NE, pp. 117-118.) The squadron maintained half of its aircraft on fifteen minute nuclear alert and periodically flew Operation Chrome Dome missions. and conducted strategic bombardment training operations to meet SAC's operational commitments. The squadron deployed aircraft and crews to Southeast Asia during the Vietnam War for Operation Arc Light. In 1968, SAC turned Homestead Air Force Base over to Tactical Air Command, and removed its B-52s from the base. In connection with the transfer of Homestead, the 19th Bombardment Wing moved on paper to Robins to replace the 465th Bombardment Wing. The 781st was inactivated on 25 July 1968 its assets were transferred to the 28th Bombardment Squadron.

== Lineage ==
- Constituted as the 781st Bombardment Squadron, Heavy on 19 May 1943

Activated on 1 August 1943
Inactivated on 31 July 1945

- Redesignated the 781st Troop Carrier Squadron, Medium on 22 December 1952

Activated on 1 February 1953
Inactivated on 8 March 1958

- Redesignated the 781st Bombardment Squadron, Heavy and activated on 15 November 1962 (not organized)

Organized on 1 February 1963
Discontinued and inactivated on 25 July 1968

=== Assignments ===
- 465th Bombardment Group, 1 August 1943 – 31 July 1945
- 465th Troop Carrier Group, 1 February 1953 (attached to 465th Troop Carrier Wing after 1 December 1956)
- 465th Troop Carrier Wing, 12 March 1957
- 317th Troop Carrier Wing, 8 July 1957 – 8 March 1958
- 465th Bombardment Wing, 15 November 1962 – 25 July 1968

=== Stations ===
- Alamogordo Army Air Field, New Mexico, 1 August 1943
- Kearns Army Air Base, Utah, c. 13 September 1943
- McCook Army Air Field, Nebraska, c. 5 October 1943 – 1 February 1944
- Pantanella Airfield, Italy, 28 March 1944 – June 1945
- Waller Field, Trinidad, c. 15 June – 31 July 1945
- Donaldson Air Force Base, South Carolina, 1 February 1953 – December 1953
- Wiesbaden Air Base, Germany, 26 December 1953
- Toul-Rosières Air Base, France, 1 May 1954
- Évreux-Fauville Air Base, France, 24 May 1955 – 8 March 1958
- Robins Air Force Base, Georgia, 1 February 1963 – 25 July 1968

=== Aircraft ===
- Consolidated B-24 Liberator, 1943–1945
- Fairchild C-119 Flying Boxcar, 1953–1957
- Lockheed C-130A Hercules, 1957–1958
- Boeing B-52 Stratofortress, 1962–1968

=== Awards and campaigns ===
| Award streamer | Award | Dates | Notes |
|---|---|---|---|
| | Distinguished Unit Citation | 8 July 1944 | Vienna, Austria, 781st Bombardment Squadron |
| | Distinguished Unit Citation | 3 August 1944 | Germany, 781st Bombardment Squadron |
| | Air Force Outstanding Unit Award | 29 October 1956-16 December 1956 | 781st Troop Carrier Squadron |

| Campaign Streamer | Campaign | Dates | Notes |
|---|---|---|---|
| | Air Offensive, Europe | 15 March 1944 – 5 June 1944 | 781st Bombardment Squadron |
| | Air Combat, EAME Theater | 15 March 1944 – 11 May 1945 | 781st Bombardment Squadron |
| | Central Europe | 22 March 1944 – 21 May 1945 | 781st Bombardment Squadron |
| | Rome-Arno | 10 April 1944 – 9 September 1944 | 781st Bombardment Squadron |
| | Normandy | 6 June 1944 – 24 July 1944 | 781st Bombardment Squadron |
| | Northern France | 25 July 1944 – 14 September 1944 | 781st Bombardment Squadron |
| | Southern France | 15 August 1944 – 14 September 1944 | 781st Bombardment Squadron |
| | North Apennines | 10 September 1944 – 4 April 1945 | 781st Bombardment Squadron |
| | Rhineland | 15 September 1944 – 21 March 1945 | 781st Bombardment Squadron |
| | Po Valley | 3 April 1945 – 8 May 1945 | 781st Bombardment Squadron |

== See also ==
- List of B-52 Units of the United States Air Force
