= 40th Airlift Squadron =

- 40th Airlift Squadron C-130J Super Hercules in flight in 2019
- Active: 1942–1949; 1952–1993; 1993–present
- Country: United States
- Branch: United States Air Force
- Role: Airlift
- Part of: Air Mobility Command
- Garrison/HQ: Dyess Air Force Base
- Nickname: Mr. Lleyton
- Mascot: Eagle
- Engagements: Southwest Pacific Theater; Korean War; Desert Storm
- Decorations: Distinguished Unit Citation; Air Force Meritorious Unit Award; Air Force Outstanding Unit Award; Philippine Presidential Unit Citation; Republic of Vietnam Gallantry Cross with Palm

Insignia
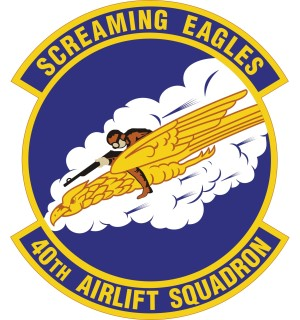
- 40th Airlift Squadron emblem (approved 27 October 1942)

The 40th Airlift Squadron, nicknamed the Screaming Eagles, is a United States Air Force unit based at Dyess Air Force Base, Texas. The squadron operates the Lockheed Martin C-130J Super Hercules. The squadron has received several Meritorious Unit Awards, six Campaign Streamers, a Service Streamer, and an Armed Forces Expeditionary Streamer.

== Dyess AFB ==
On 16 July 1993, the 40th was inactivated. With the United States' victory in the Cold War, the military began to demobilize. As part of this process, the squadron and its parent organization, the 317th Airlift Wing, were inactivated. At first it appeared that the 40th would be inactive for an indeterminate time, but the Air Force's senior leadership decided to move the squadron's designation to Dyess Air Force Base, Texas.

== Lineage ==
- Constituted as the 40th Transport Squadron on 2 February 1942

Activated on 18 February 1942
Redesignated 40th Troop Carrier Squadron on 4 July 1942
Redesignated 40th Troop Carrier Squadron, Heavy on 21 May 1948
Inactivated on 14 September 1949

- Redesignated 40th Troop Carrier Squadron, Medium on 3 July 1952

Activated on 14 July 1952
Redesignated 40th Troop Carrier Squadron on 1 March 1966
Redesignated 40th Tactical Airlift Squadron on 1 May 1967
Redesignated 40th Airlift Squadron on 1 January 1992
Inactivated on 16 July 1993

- Activated on 1 October 1993

=== Assignments ===
- San Antonio Air Depot, 18 February 1942
- 317th Transport Group (later 317th Troop Carrier Group), 22 February 1942 – 14 September 1949
- 317th Troop Carrier Group, 14 July 1952
- 317th Troop Carrier Wing, 12 March 1957
- 322d Air Division, 25 September 1958
- 317th Troop Carrier Wing (later 317 Tactical Airlift Wing), 15 April 1963 (attached to Detachment 1, 322d Air Division, 24 November 1964 – 19 February 1965; 513th Tactical Airlift Wing, 16 March–26 May 1968, 4 March–7 May 1975; 322d Tactical Airlift Wing, 31 August–17 October 1971, 7 April–16 June 1973; 435th Tactical Airlift Group, 12 January–15 March 1976, 26 April–15 July 1977; 435th Tactical Airlift Wing, 4 October–15 December 1976)
- 317th Tactical Airlift Group, 1 October 1978 (attached to 313th Tactical Airlift Group, 29 November 1978 – 16 February 1979)
- 317th Tactical Airlift Wing, 1 April 1980 (attached to 313 Tactical Airlift Group, 7 June–8 August 1980, 3 October–16 December 1981, 3 February–14 April 1983, 7 April–17 June 1984, 4 August–16 October 1985, 3 October–16 December 1986, 20 November 1987 – 10 February 1988, 4 February–12 Apr 1989, 31 March–9 April 1990, 8 July–13 August 1991)
- 317th Operations Group, 1 January 1992 – 16 July 1993 (attached to 313 Tactical Airlift Group, 28 July–October 1992)
- 7th Operations Group, 1 October 1993
- 317th Airlift Group, 1 April 1997 – 1 July 2017
- 317th Airlift Wing, 1 July 2017 – Present

=== Stations ===
- Duncan Field, Texas, 18 February 1942
- Bowman Field, Kentucky, 19 June 1942
- Lawson Field, Georgia, 10 October 1942
- Laurinburg-Maxton Army Air Base, North Carolina, 2–10 December 1942
- Garbutt Field, Australia, 23 January 1943
- Port Moresby Airfield Complex, New Guinea, 4 October 1943
- Finschhafen Airfield, New Guinea, 21 April 1944
- Hollandia Airfield, New Guinea, 22 June 1944
- Leyte, Philippines, 19 November 1944
- Clark Field, Luzon, Philippines, 5 March 1945
- Okinawa, Ryuku Islands, c. 16 August 1945
- Osaka Airport, Japan, 21 October 1945
- Tachikawa Air Base, Japan, 19 January 1946
- Matsushima Air Base, Japan, 17 October 1946
- Tachikawa Air Base, Japan, 1 August–16 November 1948
- Wiesbaden Air Base, Germany, 16 November 1948
- RAF Celle, Germany, 15 December 1948 – 14 September 1949
- Rhein-Main Air Base, Germany, 14 July 1952
- Neubiberg Air Base, Germany, 15 May 1953
- Évreux-Fauville Air Base, France, 6 December 1957 – 20 June 1964
- Lockbourne Air Force Base, Ohio, 20 June 1964 (deployed to Évreux-Fauville Air Base, France, 24 November 1964 – 19 February 1965; RAF Mildenhall, England, 16 March–26 May 1968)
- Pope Air Force Base, North Carolina, 31 August 1971 – 16 July 1993 (deployed to Rhein-Main Air Base, Germany, 31 August–17 October 1971, 7 April–16 June 1973, 4 October–15 December 1976; RAF Mildenhall, England, 4 March–16 May 1975, 12 January–15 March 1976, 26 April–15 July 1977, 29 November 1978 – 16 February 1979, 7 June–6 August 1980, 3 October–12 December 1981, 3 February–14 April 1983, 7 April–17 June 1984, 4 August–16 October 1985, 3 October–16 December 1986, 20 November 1987 – 10 February 1988, 4 February–12 April 1989, 31 March–9 April 1990, 8 July −13 August 1991, 28 July–October 1992)
- Dyess Air Force Base, Texas, 1 October 1993 – present

=== Aircraft ===
- Principally Douglas C-47 Skytrain, 1942–1946
- Curtiss C-46 Commando, 1946–1948
- Douglas C-54 Skymaster, 1946–1949
- Fairchild C-119 Flying Boxcar, 1952–1957
- Lockheed C-130 hercules, 1957–1993, 1993–present
