= Finschhafen Airport =

Airport in Finschhafen, Morobe, Papua New Guinea

- IATA: FIN; ICAO: AYFI; LID: FIN

Summary
- Airport type: Public
- Location: Finschhafen, Papua New Guinea
- Elevation AMSL: 33 ft / 10 m
- Coordinates: 06°37′20.25″S 147°51′14.81″E

Map

Runways
Direction	Length		Surface
Direction	ft	m	Surface
03/21	5,200	1,585	Asphalt
- Source: World Aero Data

Finschhafen Airport is a general aviation airport in Morobe Province, Papua New Guinea. (IATA: FIN, ICAO: AYFI). It is located on the south-east tip of Huon Peninsula at Finschafen. A half mile inland, parallel to Schneider Harbor, with Dregerhaffen to the south-east. It has no scheduled commercial airline service.

== History ==
The airport was built during World War II in late 1943 by the United States Army 807th and 808th Aviation Engineer Battalions along with the 60th Naval Construction Battalion constructed a 6,000' x 100' coral and steel matting single runway running NNW to SSE. The tower was code named 'Harvest'. In mid-November 1943, the Seabees performed rough grading on the northern end of the strip, and crushed coral for the entire area. On 5 January the 808th departed, and the 60th CB completed the airfield, building fighter and medium bomber hardstands, mostly located to the north, with more to the east and a few on the southern side of the runway. Many aircraft shipped from the United States were assembled at Finschhafen and then flown to other airfields for operations.

=== Allied units assigned to Finschhafen ===
- 86th Fighter Wing (1 May – 1 August 1944)
- 8th Fighter Group (23 December 1943 – 20 February 1944)

Headquarters, 35th, 36th Fighter Squadrons, P-40 Warhawk, P-47 Thunderbolt

- 49th Fighter Group (19 April – 17 May 1944)

Headquarters, 7th Fighter Squadron, P-40 Warhawk

- 348th Fighter Group (16 December 1943 – 29 March 1944)

Headquarters, 340th, 341st, 342d Fighter Squadrons, P-47 Thunderbolt

- 317th Troop Carrier Group (April–June 1944)

Headquarters, 319th Troop Carrier Squadron, C-47 Skytrain

- 22d Troop Carrier Squadron, (375th Troop Carrier Group), C-47 Skytrain
- 8th Combat Cargo Squadron, (2d Combat Cargo Group), C-46 Commando
- 418th Night Fighter Squadron, (380th Bombardment Wing), (28 March – 12 May 1944)

At the war's end, millions of dollars of equipment both new and used was bulldozed into huge holes in the area and abandoned.

== See also ==
- USAAF in the Southwest Pacific
