= Évreux-Fauville Air Base =

French Air Force base

Évreux-Fauville Air Base Advanced Landing Ground (ALG) B-28
- Base Aérienne 105 Évreux (BA 105)
- Évreux, Eure in France
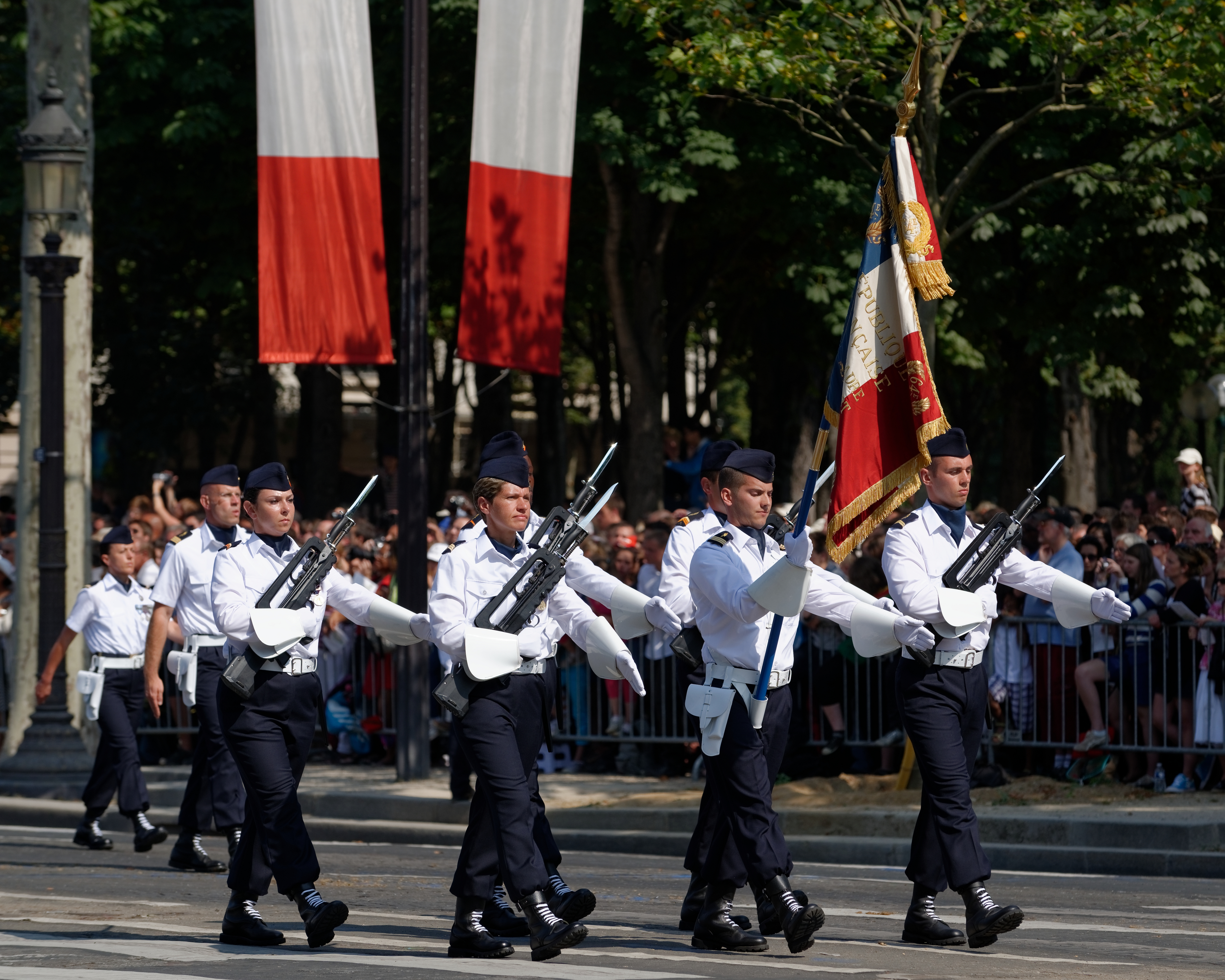
- Colour guard for the flag of Air Base 105 during the 14 July parade in Paris, 2013

Site information
- Owner: Government of France
- Operator: Armée de l'air et de l'espace

Location
- Location of Évreux-Fauville Air Base
- Coordinates: 49°01′43″N 001°13′11″E

Site history
- Built: 1920s
- In use: 1963-1946

Airfield information
- Identifiers: IATA: EVX, ICAO: LFOE
- Elevation: 141 metres (463 ft) AMSL
Runways
Direction	Length and surface
04/22	2,990 metres (9,810 ft) concrete

Évreux-Fauville Air Base (Base aérienne 105 Évreux or BA 105) (IATA: EVX, ICAO: LFOE) is a French Air and Space Force base located about 2 miles (3 km) east of the town of Évreux in the Eure département, on the north side of the Route nationale 13 (N13) Highway.

During the Cold War, Évreux-Fauville was a front-line base for the United States Air Forces in Europe (USAFE) as part of NATO's Allied Forces Central Europe.

In 1967, the US forces withdrew and the French air force began again using the base, initially flying the Nord Noratlas. At present, the base is home of two French tactical transport squadrons flying mostly Transall C-160 transportation planes.

== Units ==
The base is home to:

- Escadron de Transport 1/62 Vercors - CASA/IPTN CN-235
- Escadron de Transport 3/62 Ventoux - CN 235
- Escadron de Transport 2/64 Anjou - Transall C-160
- Escadron électronique aéroporté 1/54 Dunkerque - C-160G
- Franco-German Binational Air Transport Squadron - C-130J-30 & KC-130J

== Origins ==
The origins of Évreux Air Base go back to the 1920s, when a civil aerodrome was built to accommodate sport flying. In the 1930s concrete runways were constructed along with several hangars. During the Phoney War period of 1939/40, the French Air Force maintained Dewoitine D.510 fighters and Potez 630 bombers. In addition, American built Curtiss P-36 Hawk, Martin Maryland and Douglas DB-7 light bombers provided by President Roosevelt's "Cash and carry" program were stationed at Évreux.

With the fall of France, the Luftwaffe took up residence at Évreux, flying Messerschmitt Bf 109 and Junkers Ju 88 aircraft during the Battle of Britain. During the war, the Germans improved the runways and other facilities. Later, they stationed Focke-Wulf Fw 190 fighters on the base. Évreux was heavily bombed and attacked by Allied fighters and bombers, especially those of the USAAF Eighth and Ninth Air Forces. By July 1944, within a month of the Normandy invasion of 6 June, the runways and taxiways were useless, pockmarked with bomb craters and debris.

With the liberation of France, the Royal Air Force used Évreux Air Base until May 1945. After the war, the base was left mostly unused, with the exception of a small aero club.

With the outbreak of the Cold War in the late 1940s, with the Berlin Airlift and the ongoing threat from the Soviet Union to Western Europe, negotiations began in November 1950 between NATO and the United States to establish air bases and station combat wings in France to meet European defense needs.

During the negotiations, the World War II airfield at Évreux was proposed for expansion into a modern air base for troop carrier and cargo aircraft. However, the airfield was under local jurisdiction and the facility was being used as a civilian airport. Final approval was obtained in 1951 from the City of Évreux and the Department of Eure.

Development of Évreux Air Base was managed by the 7305th Air Base Squadron for the next three years. The USAF planned that a troop carrier wing, flying Fairchild C-119 Flying Boxcars could be in place at Évreux by 1954. Preliminary surveys were conducted in April 1952, and construction of a new base began in July. The World War II damage was removed and new runways laid down.

The design of the airfield was to space parked aircraft as far apart as possible by the construction of a circular marguerite system of hardstands that could be revetted later with earth for added protection. Typically the marguerite consisted of fifteen to eighteen hardstands around a large central hangar. Each hardstand held one or two aircraft, and allowed the planes to be spaced approximately 150 feet (50 m) apart. Each squadron was assigned to a separate hangar/hardstand complex.

Roads and buildings were constructed, communications, and other infrastructure was completed and the facilities were ready by the summer of 1955.

=== 465th Troop Carrier Wing ===
The first USAF occupant of Évreux Air Base was the 465th Troop Carrier Wing, being deployed to Évreux in May 1955. The base was still in the middle of being constructed, however minimal facilities were available to accommodate the unit. The 465th flew the C-119 Flying Boxcar and consisted of 54 aircraft being assigned to the 780th, 781st and 782nd Troop Carrier Squadrons.

The 780th and 781st TCS received the Air Force Outstanding Unit Award in 1956 for extraordinary operations. The Wing airlifted United Nations troops, supplies and equipment to the Middle East and flew Red Cross emergency supplies to Hungarian refugees, along with completing their scheduled training missions.

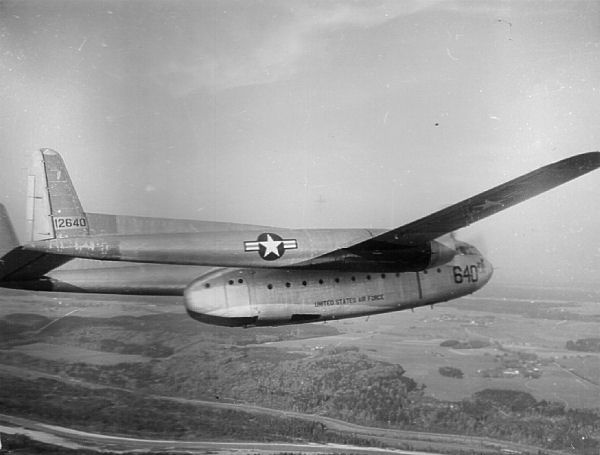
Fairchild C-119C-26-FA Flying Boxcar Serial 51-2640 781st Troop Carrier Squadron, 1954

During early 1957 the Lockheed C-130 Hercules was entering the USAF inventory and with its increased range and capacity, the C-119s began to be phased out. Also when the U.S. Army projected a decrease of airborne units in Europe, so the need for troop practice drops would decline. It was determined that the 465th would be phased down and inactivated.

The 465th TCW was reorganized on 12 March 1957 when its group headquarters was inactivated and the wing deputy commander for operations took over command of the troop carrier squadrons. At this time, manpower shortages were keeping staffing at about 70 to 80 percent of authorized levels and the reorganization eliminated about 50 personnel slots.

In July, 465th Wing Headquarters and all support squadrons were inactivated. Personnel were transferred from the support squadrons into various wing vacancies, transferred to other USAFE bases or returned to the United States (CONUS). By this time, the 465th along with the 317th TCW shared Évreux, with a total of six flying squadrons.

The end of the 465th came on 8 July when it was inactivated and the 780th and 781st squadrons came under the command of the 317th TCW. At this time, the two squadrons were directed to prepare their C-119s for return to Air Force Reserve troop carrier wings in CONUS. By December, 37 C-119s departed. On 20 December the 782d squadron was inactivated. On 6 January 1958, all the C-119s of the 317th TCW were transferred on paper to the 780th and 781st squadrons and they flew the aircraft back to CONUS.

On 8 March 1958 they were also inactivated, ending the last remnant of the 465th Troop Carrier Wing's presence at Évreux.

In March 1958 the C-119Gs of the three squadrons were returned to CONUS, and the squadrons were inactivated.

=== 317th Troop Carrier Wing ===
On 14 April 1958 the 317th Troop Carrier Wing was relocated from Neubiberg AB Germany (near Munich) to Évreux. The United States agreed to return Neubiberg to the German Air Force. By 16 April 1957 the relocation to Évreux was complete, with three squadrons, the 39th, 40th and 41st joining the 465th TCW currently at Évreux.

At Neubiberg, the 317th and transitioned from Douglas C-54 Skymasters to C-119s and shared a common mission with the 465th, transporting and paradropping airborne forces and their equipment. At Évreux, its mission was changed to support fighter weapons training at Wheelus Air Base, Libya with the transport of maintenance personnel, aircraft support equipment, spare parts, tools, test sets and other equipment needed to support the squadrons at the deployed site.

The 317th continued to fly C-119s until the end of 1957 but began converting to new Lockheed C-130A "Hercules" cargo transport aircraft. In March 1957, the 317th was inactivated along with the 465th TCW, with the aircraft and personnel coming under the direct command of HQ USAFE.

In September 1958 the flying squadrons were assigned directly to the 322nd Air Division.

=== 322nd Air Division ===
The 322nd Air Division (Combat Cargo) was the main host unit at Évreux AB, being established on 12 August 1955 and remaining until 1 April 1964. The unit was a command element to control all airlift units assigned to USAFE. The 322nd directed the three Troop Carrier Wings in Europe - the 317th and 465th at Évreux as well as the 60th at Dreux-Louvillier Air Base.

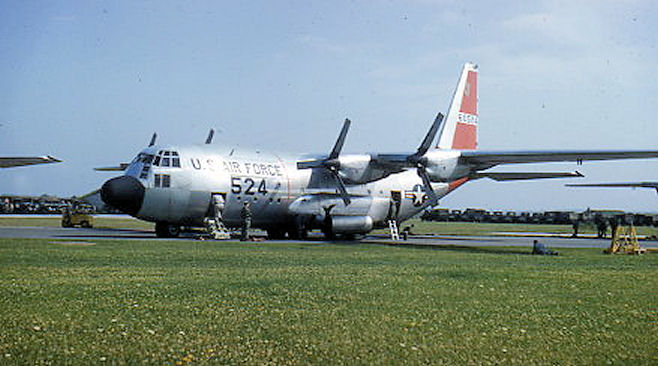
Lockheed C-130A-8-LM Hercules 56-0524 of the 40th Troop Carrier Squadron at Évreux, 1958

With the inactivation of the troop carrier wings at Évreux and Dreux, the 322nd became responsible for the operation and maintenance of the aircraft of the Troop Carrier Squadrons, with Air Base Groups being responsible for the command of the base support functions.

Units of the 322nd Air Division flew many humanitarian missions and support NATO airborne units throughout Europe. They airlifted life rafts, tents, and emergency food supplies to flood victims in the Netherlands, and aided thousands of earthquake victims in Italy, Greece, Pakistan and Yugoslavia among many others.

On 15 April 1963, the 317th Troop Carrier Wing was briefly reactivated at Évreux. HQ USAFE determined a Wing structure to command the C-130 squadrons at Évreux, and reduced the 322nd AD accordingly.

In the spring of 1964, it was decided that the 322nd Air Division would be transferred to Military Air Transport Service and the 317th TCW to Tactical Air Command. Subsequently, the 317th TCW departed Évreux on 20 June 1964 to Lockbourne AFB, Ohio.

With the departure of the Troop Carrier Wing and Air Division, Évreux was placed in a reserve status, with the 7305th Combat Support Group maintaining the base and its facilities. Tactical Air Command C-130 squadrons on temporary duty replaced the 317th wing. In November 1964 TAC C-130s on rotation to Évreux from the 464th Troop Carrier Wing at Pope AFB, NC flew the famous Dragon Rouge rescue mission at Stanleyville in the former Belgian Congo. The Évreux-based C-130s transported Belgian paratroopers to the Congo for the mission, which was followed up a few days later by a similar operation at the town of Paulis.

=== Transfer to French use ===
On 7 March 1966, French President Charles De Gaulle announced that France would withdraw from NATO's integrated military structure. The United States was informed that it must remove its military forces from France by 1 April 1967.

The 513th Troop Carrier Wing arrived at Évreux on 15 April 1966 from Sewart Air Force Base Tennessee to facilitate the removal of USAF assets in France. Its tenure at the base was brief, moving large amounts of supplies and materiel from France to Germany and the United Kingdom.

By January 1967 virtually all was complete, and the Wing was transferred to RAF Mildenhall, England departing on 26 March when Évreux was returned to the French.

Today among the French Air Force units stationed at the base are GAM 00.056 Vaucluse, with DHC-6-300, EC725L2, C-160R (on loan), and C-130H/H-30, ET 01.064 Béarn with the C-160R, ET 02.064 also with the C-160R, Escadron électronique aéroporté 1/54 Dunkerque (EEA 00.054 Dunkerque) with the C-160G Gabriel "Lion des Flandres", and EIE 01.340 also with the C-160R.

In January 2020, Évreux-Fauville Air Base was announced as the site of the ground based training system for the Archange strategic airborne intelligence program, using two (and possibly a third) Dassault Falcon Epicure (8X variant) aircraft by 2025, replacing two Transall C-160 Gabriel aircraft currently operated by Escadron électronique aéroporté 1/54 Dunkerque (EEA 00.054 Dunkerque). The electronic warfare system, known by its French acronym CUGE (capacité universelle de guerre électronique), is being developed and integrated by Thales and Dassault Aviation.

Franco-German Joint Tactical Airlift Squadron

On 30 August 2021, the French Defence Minister, Florence Parly, and the German Defence Minister, Annegret Kramp-Karrenbauer, signed an agreement to officially create a joint Franco-German tactical airlift squadron based at Évreux, with plans to fully establish the new unit within three years. A joint press release stated that French and German pilots will train in mixed teams “without distinction of nationality.” The squadron will consist of ten Lockheed Martin C-130J Super Hercules aircraft - six from Germany and four from France. It will reach initial operating capability when the first German C-130J aircraft arrives at Évreux, around February 2022, the German Air Force (Luftwaffe) said. Until then, airmen from the two countries will train on the four French Super Hercules aircraft currently on base. Full operational capability is expected around 2024. The German C-130Js will be ready to take on missions soon after they are delivered to the French air base between 2022 and 2024, according to the French Defence Ministry. In addition, as part of the agreement, Lockheed Martin was contracted to build and equip a new C-130J training centre at Évreux.
