= 782d Troop Carrier Squadron =

782d Bombardment Squadron
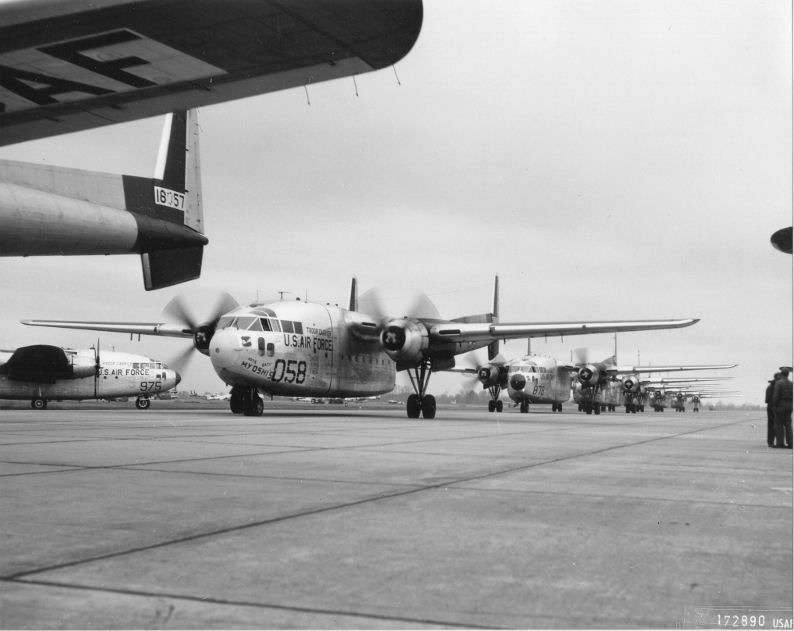
- 465th Troop Carrier Group C-119Gs
- Active: 1943–1945; 1953–1957
- Country: United States
- Branch: United States Air Force
- Role: Airlift
- Engagements: Mediterranean Theater of Operations
- Decorations: Distinguished Unit Citation

Insignia
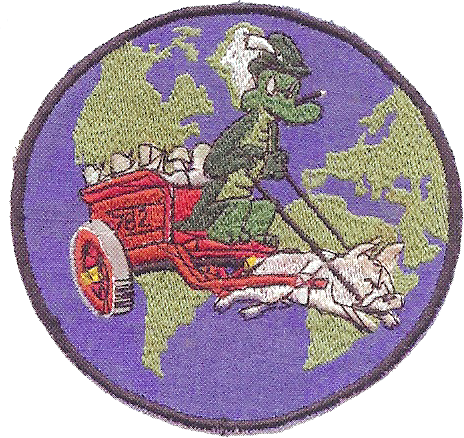
- 782d Troop Carrier Squadron emblem (Note: Approved 10 May 1955. Description: On a light blue disc with green and white land masses, the comic character Albert green with light green chest, white eyeballs, black pupils highlighted white, smoking a big black cigar, and wearing a dark green Alpine hat with white deer tail. Albert driving a brown pig with white collar, hitched to a red wagon moving through the air hauling seated armed troops, with olive drab helmets and uniforms, faces proper color, black bayonets, all detail and outline black.)

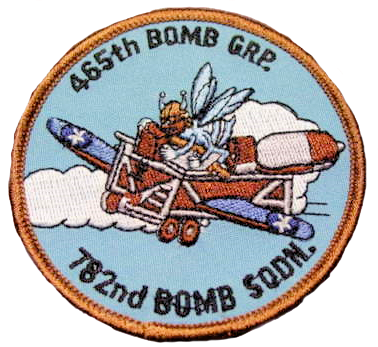
- Patch with 782d Bombardment Squadron emblem (Note: Watkins depicts an entirely different emblem as used by the squadron during World War II. Watkins, pp. 114-115. That emblem appears to have been used by the 489th Bombardment Squadron.)

The 782d Troop Carrier Squadron is an inactive United States Air Force unit. The squadron was first activated in 1943 as the 782d Bombardment Squadron. After training in the United States, it served in combat in the Mediterranean Theater of Operations as a Consolidated B-24 Liberator unit in the strategic bombing campaign against Germany. It earned two Distinguished Unit Citations for its actions. After V-E Day, the squadron served in Air Transport Command, ferrying men from the combat theater back to the United States before inactivating.

The squadron was activated again in 1953, when it replaced a reserve squadron that had been mobilized for the Korean War. It moved to France, where it provided theater airlift until inactivating in 1957.

== History ==
=== World War II ===
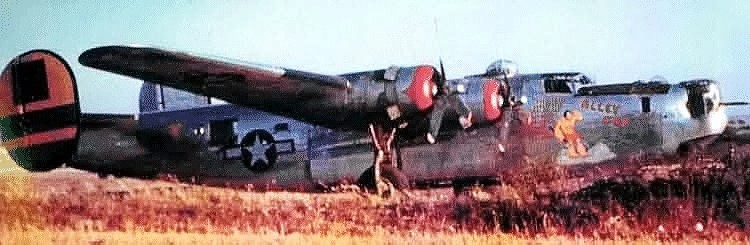
465th Group B-24H at Pantanella (Note: Aircraft is Consolidated B-24H-15-CF Liberator, serial 41-29347, Alley Oop. This plane was lost on 28 July 1944, on a mission over Yugoslavia. Baugher, Joe (18 April 2023). "1941 USAF Serial Numbers". Joe Baugher., Missing Air Crew Report 7106.)

The squadron was first activated at Alamogordo Army Air Field, New Mexico as the 782d Bombardment Squadron, one of the four original Consolidated B-24 Liberator heavy bomber squadrons of the 465th Bombardment Group. After training under Second Air Force, the squadron deployed to the Mediterranean Theater of Operations in February 1944.

The squadron arrived in the Mediterranean Theater of Operations, where it was stationed at Pantanella Airfield, Italy in March 1944. The air echelon halted in Tunisia for additional training before completing its move to Italy, where it became part of Fifteenth Air Force. It flew strategic bombardment combat missions over France, Germany, Italy, Austria and the Balkans, attacking targets such as marshalling yards, docks, aircraft factories and oil production facilities. On 8 July 1944 the squadron attacked an oil refinery and marshalling yards near Vienna, Austria despite heavy flak and fighter opposition, earning the unit a Distinguished Unit Citation. It was awarded a second citation for an attack on 3 August 1944 against a steel plant in Friedrichshafen, Germany.

The squadron was occasionally diverted from the strategic campaign. It attacked troop concentrations in May 1944 to assist partisan forces in Yugoslavia and performed interdiction missions to support the advance on Rome. Prior to Operation Dragoon, the invasion of southern France, it attacked bridges, railroads and gun emplacements near the landing area. It supported Red Army and Romanian Army forces advancing in the Balkans in October 1944 and Allied forces in Northern Italy in April 1945.

The squadron moved to Waller Field, Trinidad and became part of Air Transport Command in June 1945. It used its Liberators as transports, flying personnel from Trinidad to Florida. The unit was inactivated in Trinidad during July 1945.

=== Airlift operations ===
In February 1953, Tactical Air Command activated the 465th Troop Carrier Group at Donaldson Air Force Base, South Carolina to replace the 433d Troop Carrier Group, a reserve unit that had been mobilized for the Korean War. The squadron was redesignated the 782d Troop Carrier Squadron and assumed the personnel, mission and Fairchild C-119 Flying Boxcars of the 311th Troop Carrier Squadron, which was simultaneously inactivated. In December, the 465th Group and its squadrons at Donaldson moved to Toul-Rosières Air Base, France, where it was joined by its parent 465th Troop Carrier Wing in April 1954. (Note: The 465th Wing and Group had been operating separately since their activation in February 1953. Maurer, Combat Squadrons, pp. 340-341; Ravenstein, pp. 260-261.) The squadron participated in airlift operations, tests and exercises in Europe.

In March 1957, the 465th Wing reorganized under the dual deputy model. The 465th Group was inactivated and the 782d was reassigned directly to the 465th Wing. Four months later, the 465th Wing inactivated and transferred its operational squadrons to the 317th Troop Carrier Wing, which had moved to Évreux-Fauville Air Base from its former station at Neubiberg Air Base, Germany. The squadron continued airlift operations in France until December, when it moved to Neubiberg, assuming the remaining theater airlift assets there until inactivating later that month.

== Lineage ==
- Constituted as the 782d Bombardment Squadron, Heavy on 19 May 1943

Activated on 1 August 1943
Inactivated on 31 July 1945

- Redesignated the 782d Troop Carrier Squadron, Medium on 22 December 1952

Activated on 1 February 1953
Inactivated on 20 December 1957

=== Assignments ===
- 465th Bombardment Group, 1 August 1943 – 31 July 1945
- 465th Troop Carrier Group, 1 February 1953 (attached to 465th Troop Carrier Wing after 1 December 1956)
- 465th Troop Carrier Wing, 12 March 1957
- 317th Troop Carrier Wing, 8 July 1957 – 20 December 1957

=== Stations ===
- Alamogordo Army Air Field], New Mexico, 1 August 1943
- Kearns Army Air Base, Utah, c. 13 September 1943
- McCook Army Air Field, Nebraska, c. 5 October 1943 – 1 February 1944
- Pantanella Airfield, Italy, 25 April 1944 – June 1945
- Waller Field, Trinidad, c. 15 June – 31 July 1945
- Donaldson Air Force Base, South Carolina, 1 February 1953 – December 1953
- Neubiberg Air Base, Germany, 24 December 1953
- Toul-Rosières Air Base, France, 15 April 1954
- Évreux-Fauville Air Base, France, 24 May 1955
- Neubiberg Air Base, Germany, 5–20 December 1957

=== Aircraft ===
- B-24 Liberator, 1943–1945
- C-119 Flying Boxcar, 1953–1957
- Lockheed C-130A Hercules, 1957

=== Awards and campaigns ===
Award streamer	Award	Dates	Notes
	Distinguished Unit Citation	8 July 1944	Vienna, Austria, 782d Bombardment Squadron
	Distinguished Unit Citation	3 August 1944	Germany, 782d Bombardment Squadron

Campaign Streamer	Campaign	Dates	Notes
	Air Offensive, Europe	15 March 1944 – 5 June 1944	782d Bombardment Squadron
	Air Combat, EAME Theater	15 March 1944 – 11 May 1945	782d Bombardment Squadron
	Central Europe	22 March 1944 – 21 May 1945	782d Bombardment Squadron
	Rome-Arno	10 April 1944 – 9 September 1944	782d Bombardment Squadron
	Normandy	6 June 1944 – 24 July 1944	782d Bombardment Squadron
	Northern France	25 July 1944 – 14 September 1944	782d Bombardment Squadron
	Southern France	15 August 1944 – 14 September 1944	782d Bombardment Squadron
	North Apennines	10 September 1944 – 4 April 1945	782d Bombardment Squadron
	Rhineland	15 September 1944 – 21 March 1945	782d Bombardment Squadron
	Po Valley	3 April 1945 – 8 May 1945	782d Bombardment Squadron
