= Neubiberg Air Base =

Neubiberg Air Base Flugplatz Neubiberg
- IATA: MIG; ICAO: EDPN (EDSN)

Summary
- Airport type: Military
- Owner: Unified Armed Forces of the Federal Republic of Germany
- Operator: German Air Force
- Location: Munich, Germany
- Elevation AMSL: 1,703 ft (519 m)
- Coordinates: 48°04′23″N 011°38′10″E

Map
- Location of Neubiberg Air Base

Neubiberg Air Base is a former German Air Force and United States Air Force airfield which was closed in 1991. It is located 9 km south of the city of Munich, Germany.

Today the former base area holds the campus of the University of the Bundeswehr Munich. There is also student housing in the area. The runways are used as a recreation area and for scientific testing of vehicles. Some houses have already been built and there are plans to add parks and housing where the ground is still covered by asphalt. The runway crosses over the Munich-Salzburg autobahn.

== World War II ==
Neubiberg was originally built in 1933 as a glider field under the name "Flugplatz München Süd" (Munich South Airfield). Starting in 1935 and during World War II Neubiberg was an active Luftwaffe air base known as Unterbiberg. In 1944 Messerschmitt Me 262 jet fighter-bombers of Jagdverband 44 were stationed there. It was bombed by 15th Air Force B-24s on 16 February 1945. American armored units captured the base in April 1945.

== USAF use ==
After Neubiberg's capture, the United States Army Air Forces designated the base as Airfield R-85 Camp Rattle and stationed the 225th Anti-Aircraft Artillery Searchlight Battalion there on 16 June 1945.

=== 357th Fighter Group ===
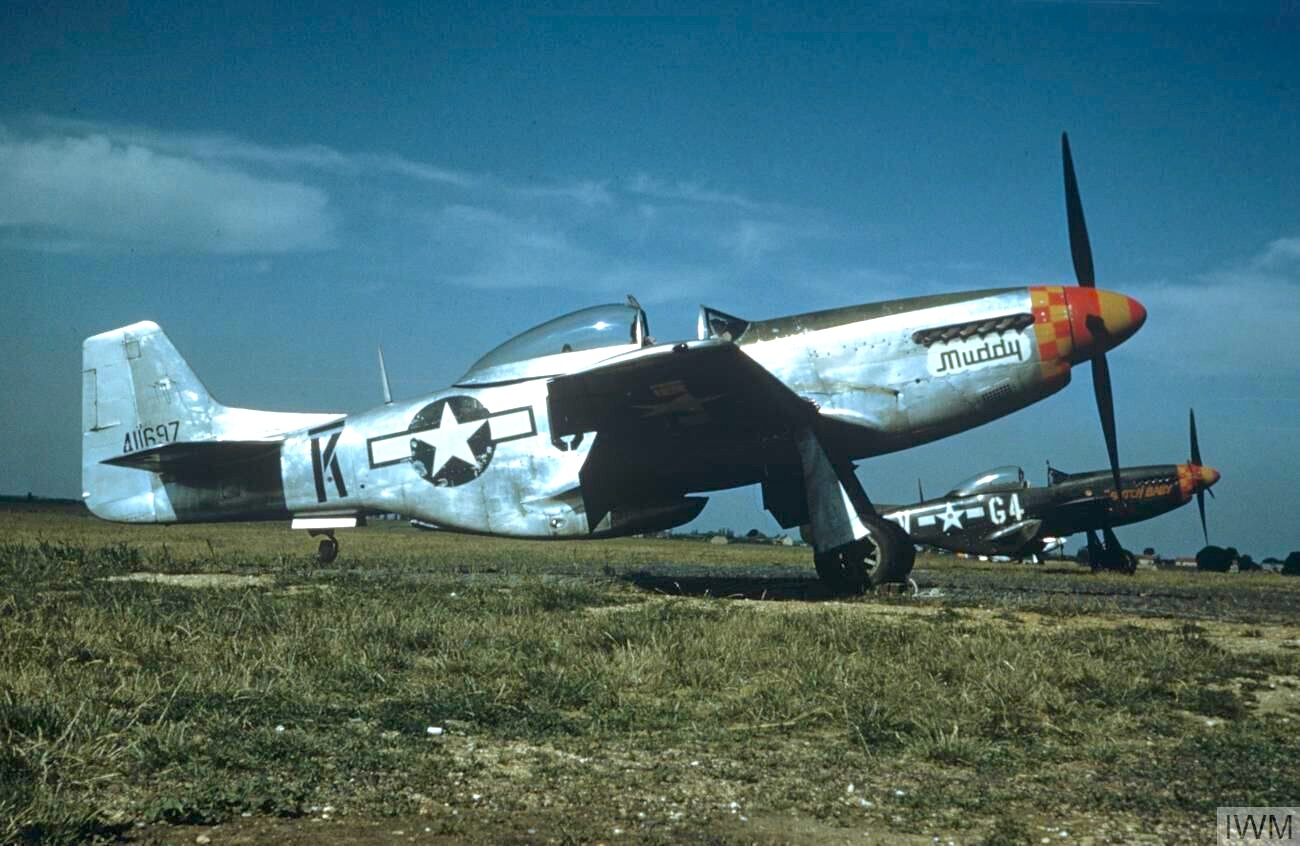
P-51 of the 357th Fighter Group

On 21 July 1945, the 357th Fighter Group transferred from its base at RAF Leiston, England, to Neubiberg to take on occupation duties. It remained there until it was inactivated on 20 August 1946 and its personnel and equipment were transferred to the 33d Fighter Group. The 357th was supported by the 439th Air Service Group. In November, the 70th Fighter Wing moved to Neubiberg, along with its 328th Signal Company, Wing (later 21st Communications Squadron). The base was restored for operational use by Companies A and B of the 843d Engineer Aviation Battalion, which were stationed at Neubiberg for most of 1945.

Operational squadrons of the 357th Fighter Group were:

- 362d Fighter Squadron (P-51D)
- 363d Fighter Squadron (P-51D)
- 364th Fighter Squadron (P-51D)

Squadrons of the 439th Air Service Group were:

- 639th Air Materiel Squadron
- 935th Air Engineering Squadron

=== 33d Fighter Group ===
On 20 August 1946 the 33d Fighter Group, which had been inactivated in December 1945, was reactivated at R-85 (Neubiberg) Air Base to replace the 357th Fighter Group. The 439th Air Service Group continued to provide support for operational units at Neubiberg. The 33d remained at R-85 for a year performing various occupation duties. In 1946 the 1262d Military Police Company, Aviation was also assigned to Neubiberg.

Operational squadrons of the 33d Fighter Group were:

- 58th Fighter Squadron (P-51D)
- 59th Fighter Squadron (P-51D)
- 60th Fighter Squadron (P-51D)

After serving for a year in Germany, the 33d was transferred to Bad Kissingen, Germany on 25 August 1947, then returned to the United States, transferring to Andrews Field, Maryland briefly before moving to Roswell Army Air Field, New Mexico as part of Strategic Air Command on 16 September 1947.

=== 86th Fighter-Bomber Wing ===
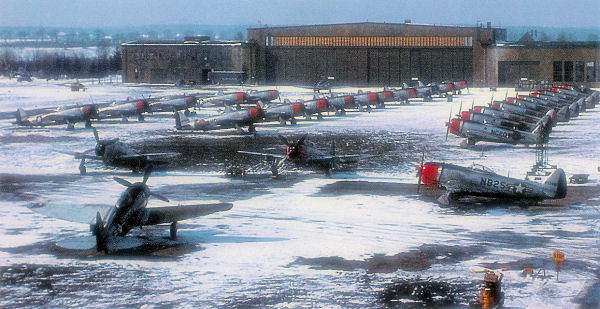
F-47Ds of the 526th Fighter Squadron / 86th Fighter Wing - 1949

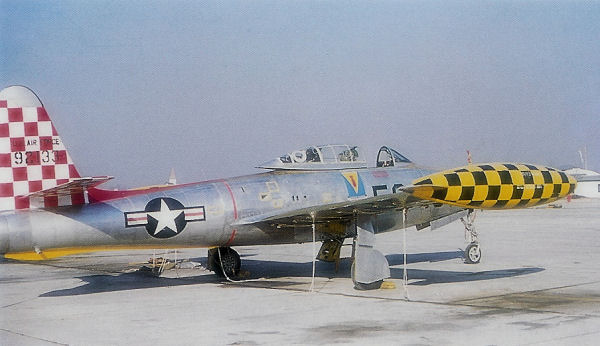
Republic F-84E-5-RE Thunderjet Serial 49-2133 of the 527th Fighter-Bomber Squadron

The 86th Composite Group moved to Neubiberg on 12 June 1947 from Bad Kissingen eventually replacing the 33d Fighter Group. At the same time the 486th Air Service Group replaced the 439th.

Operational squadrons of the 86th were:

- 525th Fighter Squadron (later 525th Fighter-Bomber Squadron) (F-47D, F-84E (1950) blue stripe)
- 526th Fighter Squadron (later 526th Fighter-Bomber Squadron) (F-47D, F-84E (1950) red stripe)
- 527th Fighter Squadron (later 527th Fighter-Bomber Squadron) (F-47D, F-84E (1950) white/yellow stripe)
- 45th Reconnaissance Squadron (not stationed at Neubiberg)

Squadrons of the 486th Air Service Group were:

- 728th Air Materiel Squadron
- 904th Air Engineering Squadron/

The 86th Composite Group had been activated at Bad Kissingen on 20 August 1946 and assigned to United States Air Forces in Europe (USAFE). The group's fighter squadrons were initially equipped with low-hour P/F-47D "Thunderbolts" removed from storage at various depots in Germany.

Initially, the group performed mostly occupation duty, however, it flew escort missions for its Consolidated B-24 Liberator reconnaissance aircraft along the borders of Czechoslovakia and the Soviet Zone of Germany, occasionally engaging with Soviet aircraft as they harassed the reconnaissance flights. In January 1948 the 45th Reconnaissance Squadron was reassigned and the 86th Composite Group became the 86th Fighter Group.

The mission of the 86th changed with the start of the Berlin Airlift, to escort the cargo flights within the narrow air corridors between the American Zone and Tempelhof Airport in West Berlin. When the airlift began the 86th was the only tactical fighter group in USAFE.

On 1 July 1948 USAFE adopted the wing-base organization. The 86th Fighter-Bomber Group was assigned to the new 86th Fighter-Bomber Wing, while the wing's 86th Air Base Group, 86th Maintenance & Supply Group and 86th Station Medical Group replaced the 486th Air Service Group and the 1262d Military Police Company.

In October 1950 the 27th Fighter-Escort Wing ferried ninety-one Republic F-84E Thunderjets to Neubiberg from Bergstrom Air Force Base Texas. The 86th's F-47s were distributed to other North Atlantic Treaty Organization units and the Thunderjets were assigned to the 86th. In January 1953 the 86th wing was transferred west of the Rhine River to the newly completed Landstuhl Air Base.

=== 160th/38th Tactical Reconnaissance Squadron ===
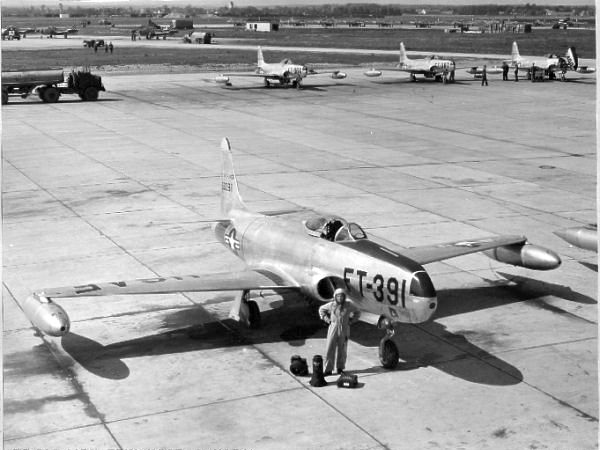
RF-80 of the 160th Tactical Reconnaissance Squadron

The 160th Tactical Reconnaissance Squadron deployed to Neubiberg from Toul-Rosières Air Base, France. The 160th was part of the Alabama Air National Guard 117th Tactical Reconnaissance Wing which had been activated during the Korean War. In 1952, Toul Air Base was unfinished and not yet ready for jet aircraft. This meant only the wing headquarters was in France, and its two RF-80A squadrons were moved to Germany. At the time of their arrival, the 160th's aircraft were silver with only "Buzz Numbers" on their noses. Later, blue lightning bolts were painted on their vertical stabilizers, and yellow lightning flashes were painted on the center fuselage and wing tip tanks.

On 10 July 1952, the 10th Tactical Reconnaissance Wing was activated at Toul Air Base and absorbed the personnel and equipment of the 117th. The 160th at Neubiberg was returned to the Alabama Air National Guard and replaced by the 38th Tactical Reconnaissance Squadron, which took over its personnel and RF-80As. The 38th remained at Neubiberg until 9 May 1953 when it moved to the newly opened Spangdahlem Air Base.

=== 317th Troop Carrier Wing ===
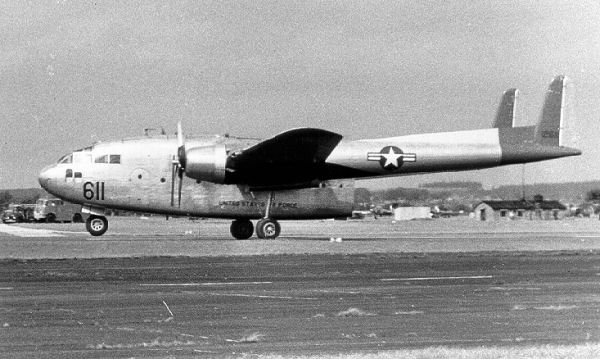
Fairchild C-119C-25-FA Flying Boxcar Serial 51-2611 of the 317th TCW

The 317th TCW was moved to Neubiberg from Rhein-Main Air Base in 1953 to address an overcrowded condition. Flying C-119 Flying Boxcars, the Wing remained for almost four years before transferring to Evreux-Fauville Air Base France.

- 14 July 1952 – 17 April 1957: 317th Troop Carrier Wing
  - 317th Air Base Group
  - 317th Maintenance & Supply Group
  - 317th Medical Group (later 317th Tactical Hospital)
  - 7307th USAF Infirmary (later 7307th USAF Dispensary), (organized 1 March 1954)
  - 5th Aerial Port Squadron, December 1954 - January 1956
  - 39th Troop Carrier Squadron (C-119)
  - 40th Troop Carrier Squadron (C-119)
  - 41st Troop Carrier Squadron (C-119)
  - 782d Troop Carrier Squadron (C-119), 24 September 1953 – 15 April 1954 (assigned to 465th Troop Carrier Group)

In November 1953, the 782d Troop Carrier Squadron was sent to Neubiberg when the 465th Troop Carrier Wing was deployed from Donaldson Air Force Base South Carolina. Construction at Toul forced the deployment of the squadron to Neubiberg. The 782d flew missions with the 317th TCW until at Toul AB allowed the squadron to use the facilities.

=== 7101st Support Group ===
The 7101st Support Group was organized to manage Neubiberg until it was transferred to the German Air Force.

- 17 April 1957 - c. 1 April 1958
  - 782d Troop Carrier Squadron (C-119), 5 December 1957 – 20 December 1957 (assigned to 317th Troop Carrier Group)

=== 5th Tow Target Squadron ===
- 16 July 1954 - c. 1 April 1958 (B-26 [A-26], B-29, C-47)

The 5th Tow Target Squadron moved to Neubiberg from Fürstenfeldbruck Air Base on 16 July 1954. Its mission was towing aerial targets for NATO Air Forces and Army Anti-Aircraft gunnery, and had detachments at RAF Sculthorpe, England (Det. A(1)), Bremen Germany, and North Africa.

Aircraft flown by the 5th were Douglas TB-26B/C Invaders in Europe and a number of L-5 Sentinels. In North Africa, B-29s were used. Squadron markings consisted of Red and White horizontal stripes on the vertical and horizontal stabilizer and red wingtips.

The unit was inactivated when Neubiberg was turned over to the German Air Force.

== German Air Force use ==
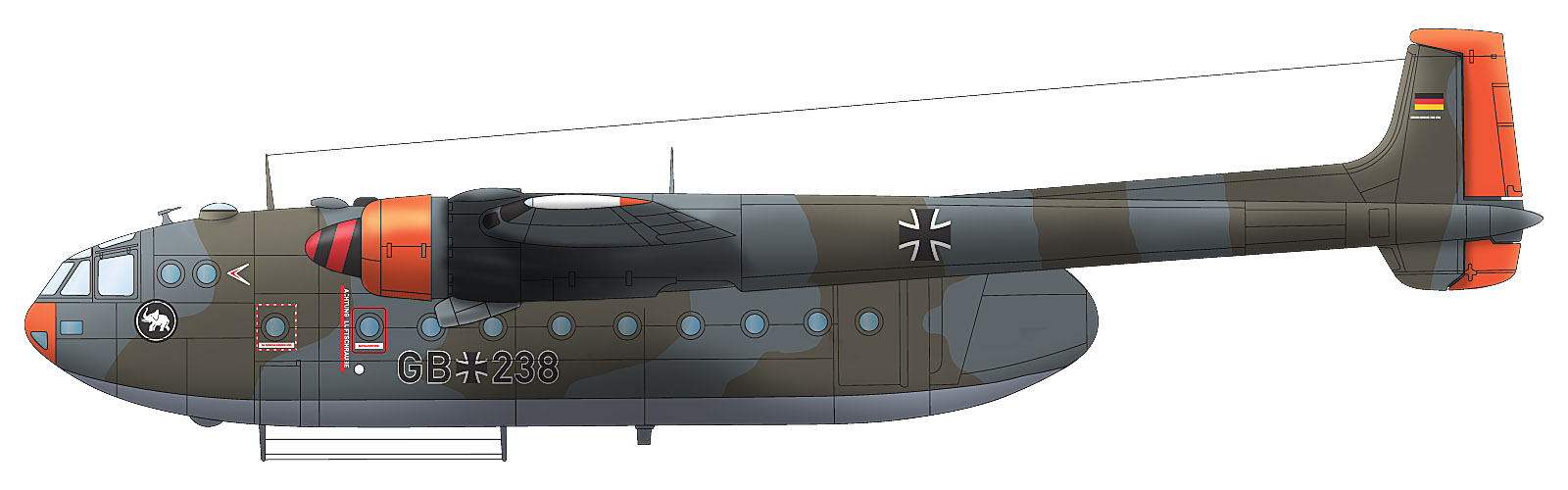
Nord 2501 Noratlas of LTG 61

Neubiberg was turned over to the German Air Force in 1958. Lufttransportgeschwader 61 (Air Transport Wing 61) was formed at Erding Air Base on 24 August 1957 as the first wing of the new German Air Force. Its first squadron (1/LTG 61) was equipped with Douglas C-47 Skytrains, while its second (2/LTG 61) was activated in December and equipped with Nord 2501 Noratlases. The wing moved to Neubiberg in April 1958. Once 2/LTG 61 was fully equipped, 1/LTG 61 converted to Noratlases.

By the end of 1970, the wing re-equipped with the Transall C-160. The following year LTG 61 moved to Penzing Air Base. The wing was replaced by "Fliegerhorstgruppe Neubiberg" (Neubiberg Air Base Group), which became "Fliegerhorststaffel Neubiberg" (Neubiberg Air Base Squadron) in 1979.

== Today use ==
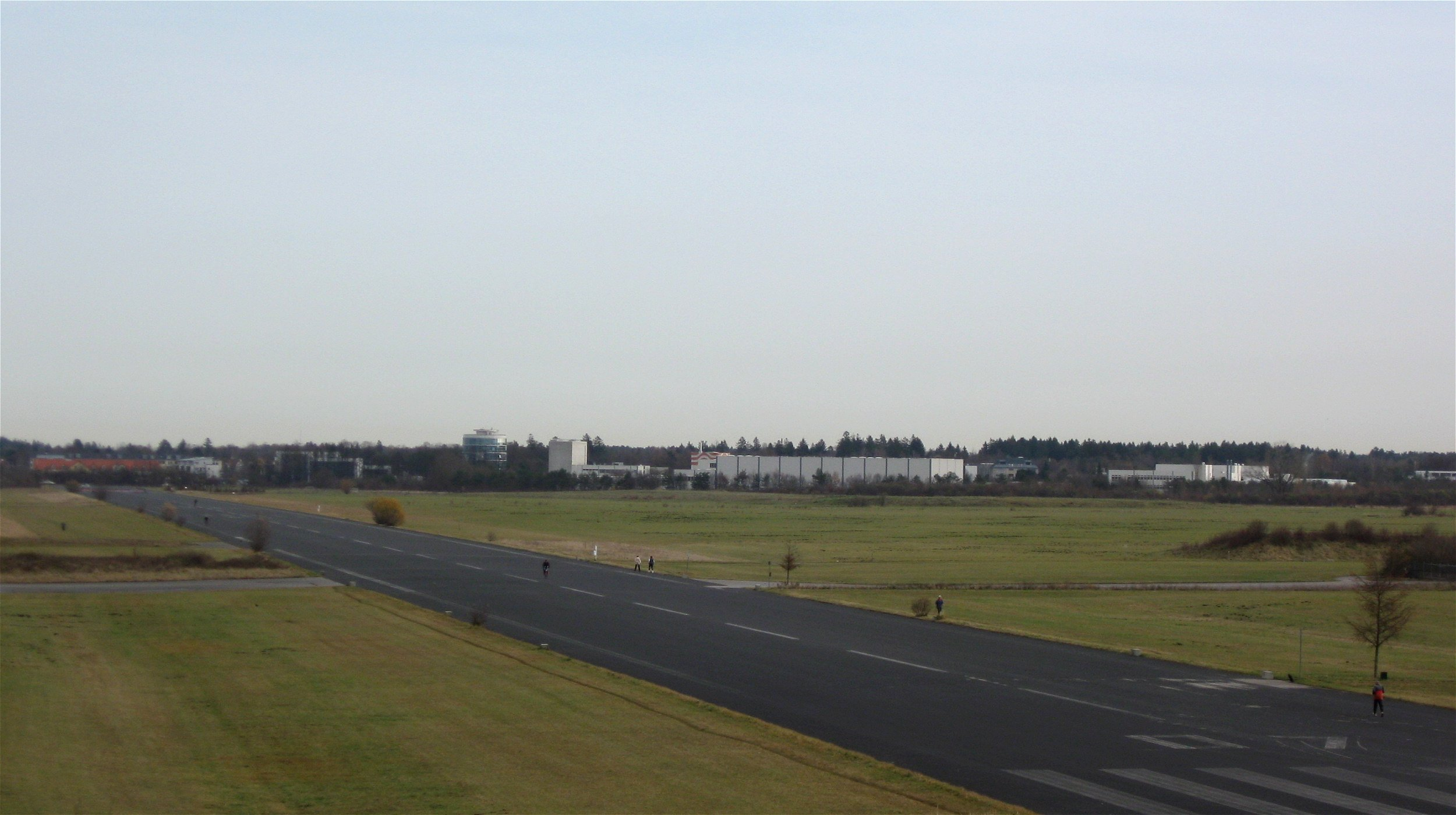
Area in 2009

Neubiberg was closed for military use in 1991. It was still used by civil aviation and police helicopters till 1998.

Today it is used as a leisure area.

== See also ==
- German Air Force
- United States Air Force In Germany
- University of the Bundeswehr Munich
- de:Fliegerhorst Neubiberg
