= Centre d'Instruction des Equipages de Transport 340 Général Lionel de Marmier =

Transport Crew Training Center 340 Général Lionel de Marmier
- Centre d'Instruction des Equipages de Transport 340 Général Lionel de Marmier
- Country: France
- Branch: French Air and Space Force
- Type: Military transport aircraft
- Role: Crew Training Center
- Garrison/HQ: Orléans – Bricy Air Base

Transport Crew Training Center 340 Général Lionel de Marmier is a French Air and Space Force training unit located at Orléans – Bricy Air Base, Loiret, France which operates transport aircraft.

== See also ==
- List of French Air and Space Force aircraft squadrons
