= Escadron de Transport 3/61 Poitou =

Transport Squadron 3/61 Poitou
- Escadron de Transport 3/61 Poitou
- Active: May 10, 1945 -
- Country: France
- Branch: French Air and Space Force
- Type: Military transport aircraft
- Role: Transport/ Special Forces
- Garrison/HQ: Orléans – Bricy Air Base

Aircraft flown
- Transport: Lockheed C-130H Hercules; Airbus Military A400M Atlas de Havilland Canada DHC-6 Twin Otter

Escadron de Transport 3/61 Poitou is a French Air and Space Force squadron located at Orléans – Bricy Air Base, Loiret, France which operates the Lockheed C-130H Hercules, Airbus Military A400M and the de Havilland Canada DHC-6 Twin Otter.

== Denominations ==
- Groupe de Transport (GT) IV/15 Poitou (1945 - 1947)
- Groupe de Transport III/61 Poitou (1947 - 1953)
- Escadron de Transport (ET) 3/61 Poitou (1953 - )

== Escadrilles ==
- From May 10, 1945 to June 23, 2006 :
  - 1st Escadrille : Escadrille IV/15(1)
  - 2nd Escadrille : Escadrille IV/15(2)
- Since June 23, 2006 :
  - 1st Escadrille : Escadrille F 118 (used the Transall, now the A400M Atlas)
  - 2nd Escadrille : Escadrille F 119 (use the C-130H)
  - 3rd Escadrille (since January 13, 2014) : Escadrille F 121 (use the Twin Otter)

== Aircraft used ==
- Beechcraft UC-45 (1945 - 1946)
- Amiot AAC.1 Toucan (1946 - 1954)
- Douglas C-47 Dakota (1953 - 1955)
- Nord N.2501 Noratlas (1953 - 1967)
- Transport Allianz C.160 Transall (1967 - 2022)
- Lockheed C-130H Hercules (2006 - )
- De Havilland Canada DHC-6 Twin Otter (2012 - )
- Airbus Military A400M Atlas (2021 - )

== See also ==
- List of French Air and Space Force aircraft squadrons
