= Escadron électronique aéroporté 1/54 Dunkerque =

Airborne Electronic Squadron 1/54 "Dunkirk"
- Escadron électronique aéroporté 00.054 Dunkerque
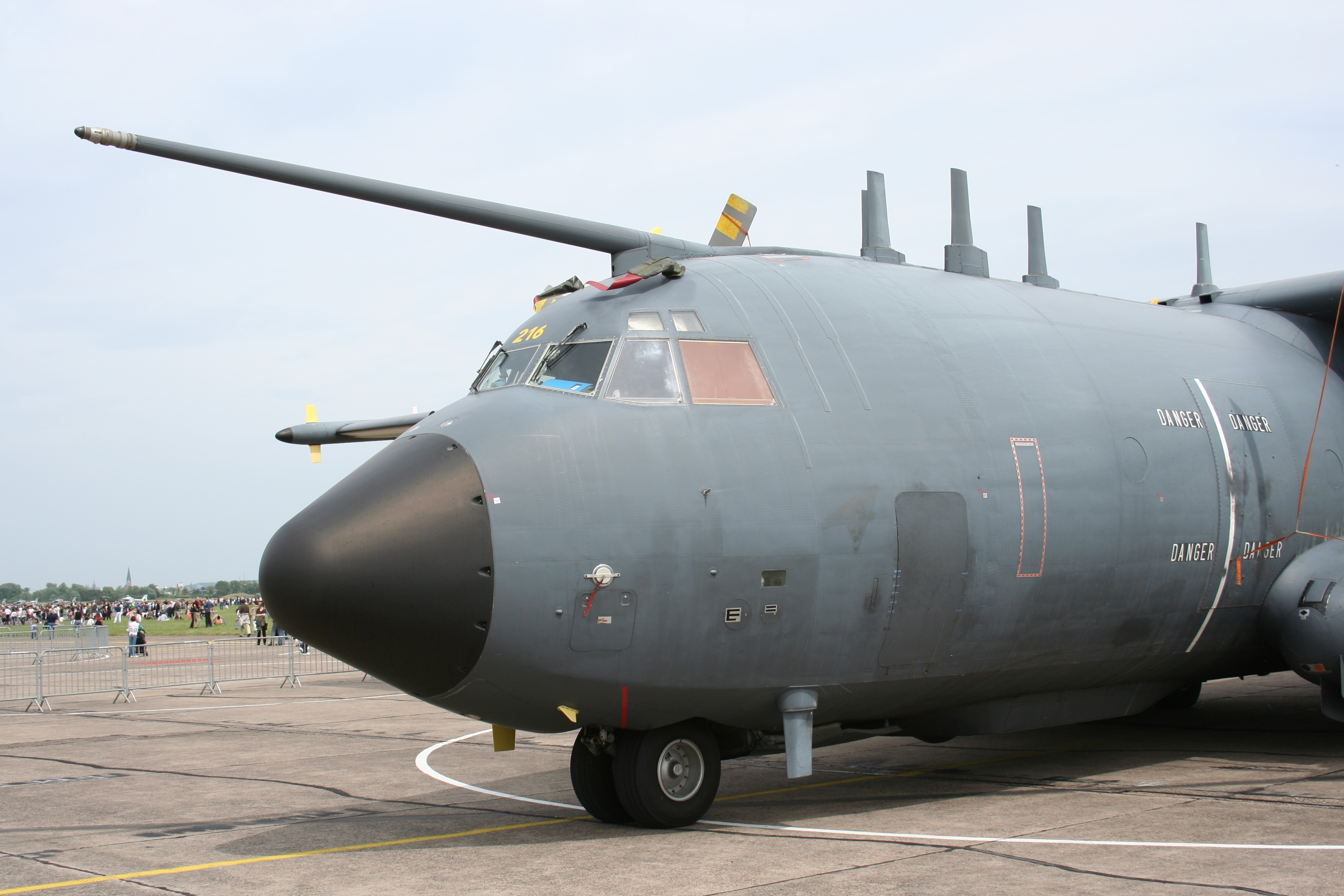
- Transall C160 Gabriel, 2007
- Active: 1968 - present
- Country: France
- Branch: French Air and Space Force
- Role: Electronic intelligence gathering
- Garrison/HQ: BA 105 Évreux-Fauville Air Base

Aircraft flown
- Electronic warfare: Transall C-160G "Gabriel"; Beechcraft King Air 350ER "Vader"

Escadron électronique aéroporté 00.054 Dunkerque is an electronic warfare unit of the French Air and Space Force equipped with the Transall C-160G "Gabriel"s and Beechcraft King Air 350ER "Vader"s. It was stationed at Metz-Frescaty Air Base (BA 128) until it was transférred to Évreux-Fauville Air Base (BA 105).

== Designations ==
- 1964 : Escadrille électronique 00.054
- 1985 : Escadron électronique 00.054
- 1988 : Escadron électronique 01.054
- 2006 : Escadron électronique aéroporté 11.054
- September 2009 : Escadron électronique aéroporté 00.054.

== Aircraft ==
The squadron was equipped with eight Nord 2501 "Gabriel"; the first operational flight of a Nord "Gabriel" took place in October 1962. The last flight took place on 5 October 1989.

Since 1989, the Transall Gabriel or C160G has replaced the Nord Gabriel. Only two aircraft of the type are in service.

The first Beechcraft King Air 350ER "Vader" arrived on August 6, 2020.

== See also ==
- List of French Air and Space Force aircraft squadrons
