= Escadron de Transport 2/64 Anjou =

French Air and Space Force Squadron

Transport Squadron 2/64 Anjou
- Escadron de Transport 2/64 Anjou
- Country: France
- Branch: French Air and Space Force
- Type: Military transport aircraft
- Role: Transport
- Garrison/HQ: Évreux-Fauville Air Base

Aircraft flown
- Transport: Transall C-160R

Escadron de Transport 2/64 Anjou is a French Air and Space Force squadron located at Évreux-Fauville Air Base, Eure, France which operates the Transall C-160R.

== See also ==
- List of French Air and Space Force aircraft squadrons
