= Escadron de Transport 1/62 Vercors =

Transport Squadron 1/62 Vercors
- Escadron de Transport 1/62 Vercors
- Country: France
- Branch: French Air and Space Force
- Type: Military transport aircraft
- Role: Transport
- Garrison/HQ: Évreux-Fauville Air Base

Aircraft flown
- Transport: CASA CN235M-200/300

Escadron de Transport 1/62 Vercors is a French Air and Space Force squadron located at Évreux-Fauville Air Base, Eure, France which operates the CASA CN235M-200/300.

== See also ==
- List of French Air and Space Force aircraft squadrons
