= Dassault Falcon Epicure =

French surveillance aircraft project

Falcon Epicure

General information
- Type: Airborne battlefield and surveillance aircraft
- Manufacturer: Dassault Aviation
- Status: Project
- Primary user: French Air Force

History
- Introduction date: at least 2025
- Developed from: Dassault Falcon 7X

The Dassault Falcon Epicure is a project of Dassault Aviation and Thales for a surveillance, reconnaissance, and electronic warfare aircraft. This will replace by 2025 the two Transall Gabriel currently used by the French Air Force for strategic missions of electronic warfare and airborne espionage. Falcon Epicure will be developed from the Falcon 7X as the basis for work. It is currently unknown whether or not the aircraft will be refueled. In the French Air Force this aircraft will be part of the CUGE program, for Capacité Universelle de Guerre Électronique or in English Universal Electronic Warfare Capacity.
