= Archange =

Archange is a given name. Notable people with the name include:

- Archange de Lyon (1736–1822), French Capuchin theologian and preacher
- Archange Nkumu (born 1993), English footballer

== See also ==
- Archangel (disambiguation)
