= Escadron de Transport 2/61 Franche-Comté =

Transport Squadron 2/61 Franche-Comté
- Escadron de Transport 2/61 Franche-Comté
- Country: France
- Branch: French Air and Space Force
- Type: Military transport aircraft
- Role: Transport
- Garrison/HQ: Orléans – Bricy Air Base

Aircraft flown
- Transport: Lockheed C-130H Hercules; Lockheed Martin C-130J Super Hercules; Lockheed Martin KC-130J

Escadron de Transport 2/61 Franche-Comté is a French Air and Space Force squadron located at Orléans – Bricy Air Base, Loiret, France which operates the Lockheed C-130H Hercules, Lockheed Martin C-130J Super Hercules and the Lockheed Martin KC-130J.

== See also ==
- List of French Air and Space Force aircraft squadrons
