= Orléans – Bricy Air Base =

Orléans - Bricy Air Base Base aérienne 123
- IATA: none; ICAO: LFOJ

Summary
- Owner: Government of France
- Operator: Armée de l'air et de l'espace
- Location: Orléans, France
- Elevation AMSL: 314 ft / 96 m
- Coordinates: 47°59′15″N 001°45′38″E

Map
- Location of Orléans – Bricy Air Base

Runways
Direction	Length		Surface
Direction	m	ft	Surface
07/25	2,400	7,874	Asphalt
02/20		4,000	Turf

Orléans – Bricy Air Base (French: Base aérienne 123 « Commandant Charles Paoli ») (ICAO: LFOJ) is a French Air and Space Force (Armée de l'air et de l'espace) (ALAE) base. The base is located approximately 6 miles (9.7 km) north-northwest of Ingré near the city of Orléans; about 65 miles (105 km) south-southwest of Paris, France.

The mission of the base is primarily tactical airlift.

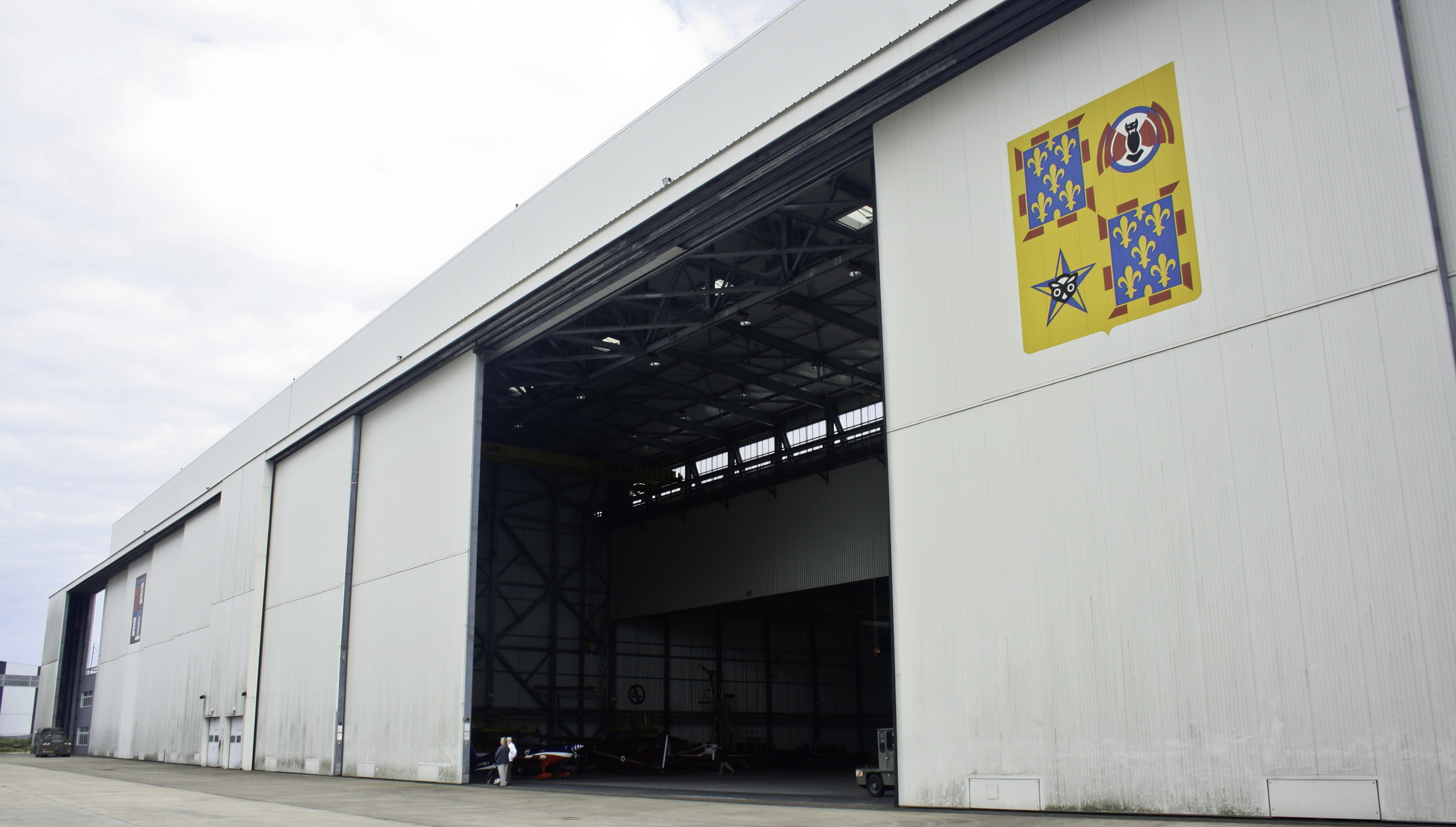
Hangar from 1/61 Touraine tactical transport squadron

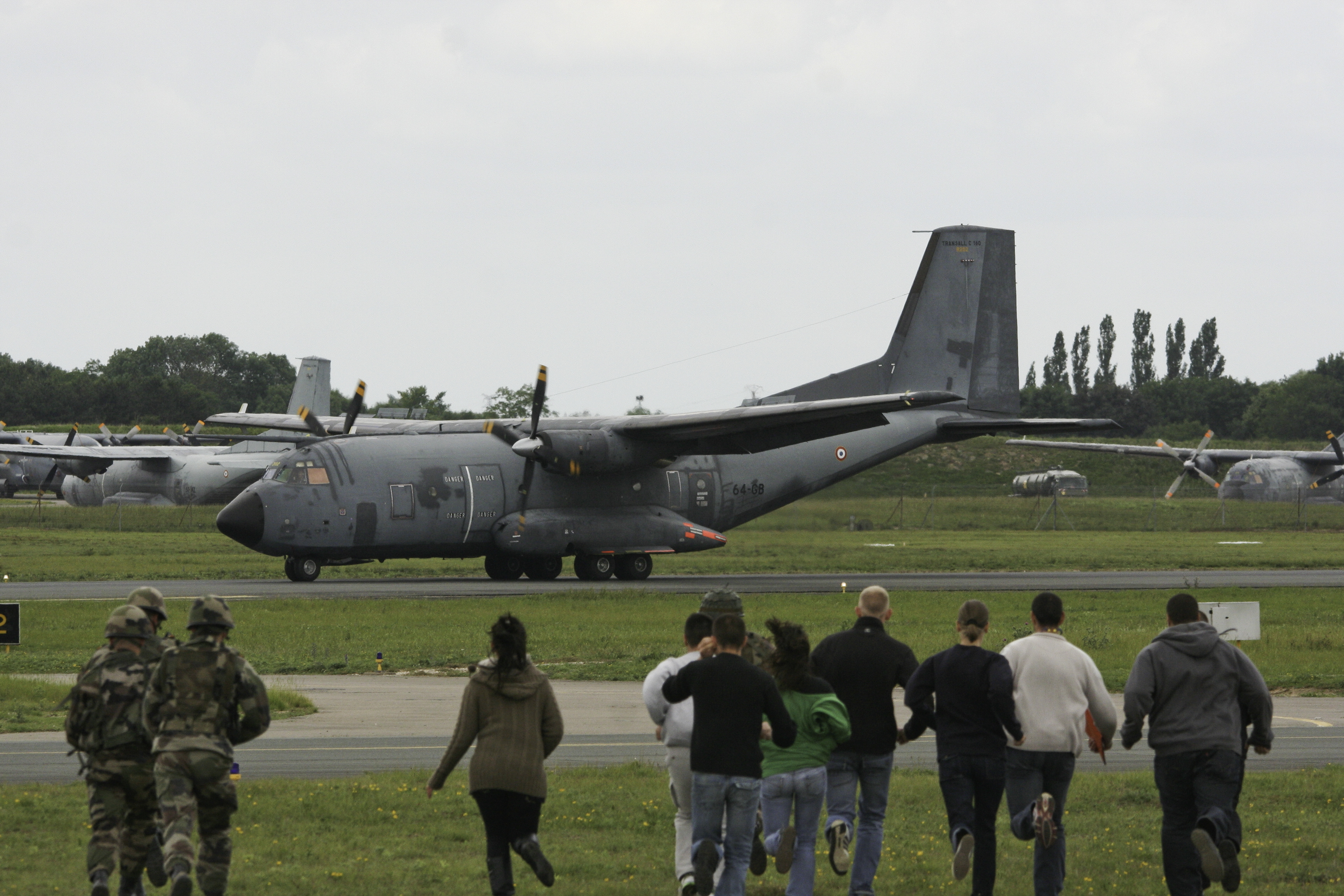
Demo with C-160 during the airshow on the base in June 2010

== Units ==
- Escadron de Transport 1/61 Touraine with the Airbus A400M Atlas
- Escadron de Transport 2/61 Franche-Comté with the Lockheed C-130H Hercules, Lockheed Martin C-130J Super Hercules and the Lockheed Martin KC-130J
- Escadron de Transport 3/61 Poitou with the Lockheed C-130H Hercules and the de Havilland Canada DHC-6 Twin Otter
- Centre d'Instruction des Equipages de Transport 340 Général Lionel de Marmier

== Aircraft ==
- 5 Lockheed C-130H Hercules
- 8 Lockheed C-130H-30
- c11 Airbus A400M

== History ==
Orléans-Bricy Air Base was built prior to World War II as a French Air Force facility. It was seized by the Germans in June 1940 during the Battle of France, and was used as a major Luftwaffe military airfield during the occupation. LG 1 (Luftflotte (Air Fleet) 3/Fliegerkorps (Division) V/1st Heavy Fighter Wing) stationed Junkers Ju 88A-5 (Fuselage Code L1+) day/night interceptors at the base.

It was liberated by Allied ground forces about 22 August 1944 during the Northern France Campaign. Almost immediately, the USAAF IX Engineering Command 832d, 833dd and 877th Engineer Aviation Battalions began clearing the base of mines and destroyed Luftwaffe aircraft and repairing operational facilities for use by American aircraft. Subsequently, Bricy became a USAAF Ninth Air Force combat airfield, designated as "A-50" about 24 August, only a few days after its capture from German forces.

Almost immediately, the repaired base became home to numerous combat units.

- 394th Bombardment Group, flew Martin B-26 Marauders from 18 September through 8 October 1944
- 440th Troop Carrier Group, flew Douglas C-47 Skytrains from 2 November 1944 through 18 October 1945. The C-47s pulled gliders in the airborne assault across the Rhine (Operation Varsity).

The Americans returned control of the base to the French Air Force at the end of October 1945 and it returned to being a French military airfield.

After the war, the base was completely rebuilt. An 8000' new jet runway was laid down along with two circular marguerite systems of hardstands that could be revetted later with earth for added protection. The Marguerite consist of fifteen to eighteen hardstands around a semicircular taxiway. Each hardstand can hold one or two aircraft, and allows the planes to be spaced approximately 150 feet (46 m) apart. Each marguerite is dispersed at each end of the runway, allowing the aircraft to be launched quickly. Each squadron is assigned to a separate hangar/hardstand complex. The wartime main runway was extended to become the taxiway for the new jet runway. Additional dispersed aircraft parking, ramp space and hangars were also constructed, along with a completely new administrative and personnel area. A 4000' grass runway was also constructed for glider and small aircraft landings.

Bricy is the home of the Airbus A400M Atlas new European tactical cargo aircraft for the French Air and Space Force.

== See also ==
- Advanced Landing Ground
