= Escadron de Transport 1/61 Touraine =

Transport Squadron 1/61 Touraine
- Escadron de Transport 1/61 Touraine
- Country: France
- Branch: French Air and Space Force
- Type: Military transport aircraft
- Role: Transport
- Garrison/HQ: Orléans – Bricy Air Base

Aircraft flown
- Transport: Airbus A400M Atlas

Escadron de Transport 1/61 Touraine is a French Air and Space Force squadron located at Orléans – Bricy Air Base, Loiret, France which operates the Airbus A400M Atlas.

The second A400M for the squadron was christened "Ville de Toulouse" on January 22, 2014 at Toulouse–Blagnac Airport.

== See also ==
- List of French Air and Space Force aircraft squadrons
