= Archange de Lyon =

French Capuchin theologian and preacher

Archange de Lyon (secular name Michael Desgranges) (b. at Lyon, 2 March 1736; d. there 13 October 1822) was a French Capuchin theologian and preacher. He is regarded as the restorer of the Capuchin order in France, after the French Revolution.

== Life ==
He joined the Capuchins 4 March 1751, and held the post of lector in theology about the end of the eighteenth century. In 1789, having preached against the States General, he was obliged to leave France.

He returned in disguise to Lyon about 1796, and became curé of the parish of the Carthusians. On the re-establishment of his order at Chambéry he resumed his monastic habit there in 1818. He devoted himself to preaching missions and stations in Savoy and France until, in 1821, he was able to re-open the former convent of his order at Crest, Drôme.

== Works ==
His works comprise:

- Discours adressé aux juifs et utile aux chrétiens pour les confirmer dans leur foi (Lyons, 1788);
- Aperçu nouveau d'un plan d'éducation catholique" (Lyons, 1814);
- Réflexions intéressantes sur le 'Génie du christianisme' (Turin, 1815);
- Précis abrégé des vérités, qui distinguent le culte catholique de toutes les sectes chrétiennes et avouées par l'église de France (Lyons, 1817);
- Explication de la lettre encyclique du pape Benoît XIV sur les usures (Lyons, 1822);
- Dissertations philosophiques historiques et théologiques sur la religion catholique (Lyons, 1836).

Edmond-Denis De Manne, in his Nouveau dictionnaire des ouvrages anonymes, attributes to him an Essai sur le jeu considéré sous le rapport de la morale et du droit naturel (Paris, 1835).
