= 22nd Airlift Squadron =

Unit of the US Air Force, part of the 60th Operations Group

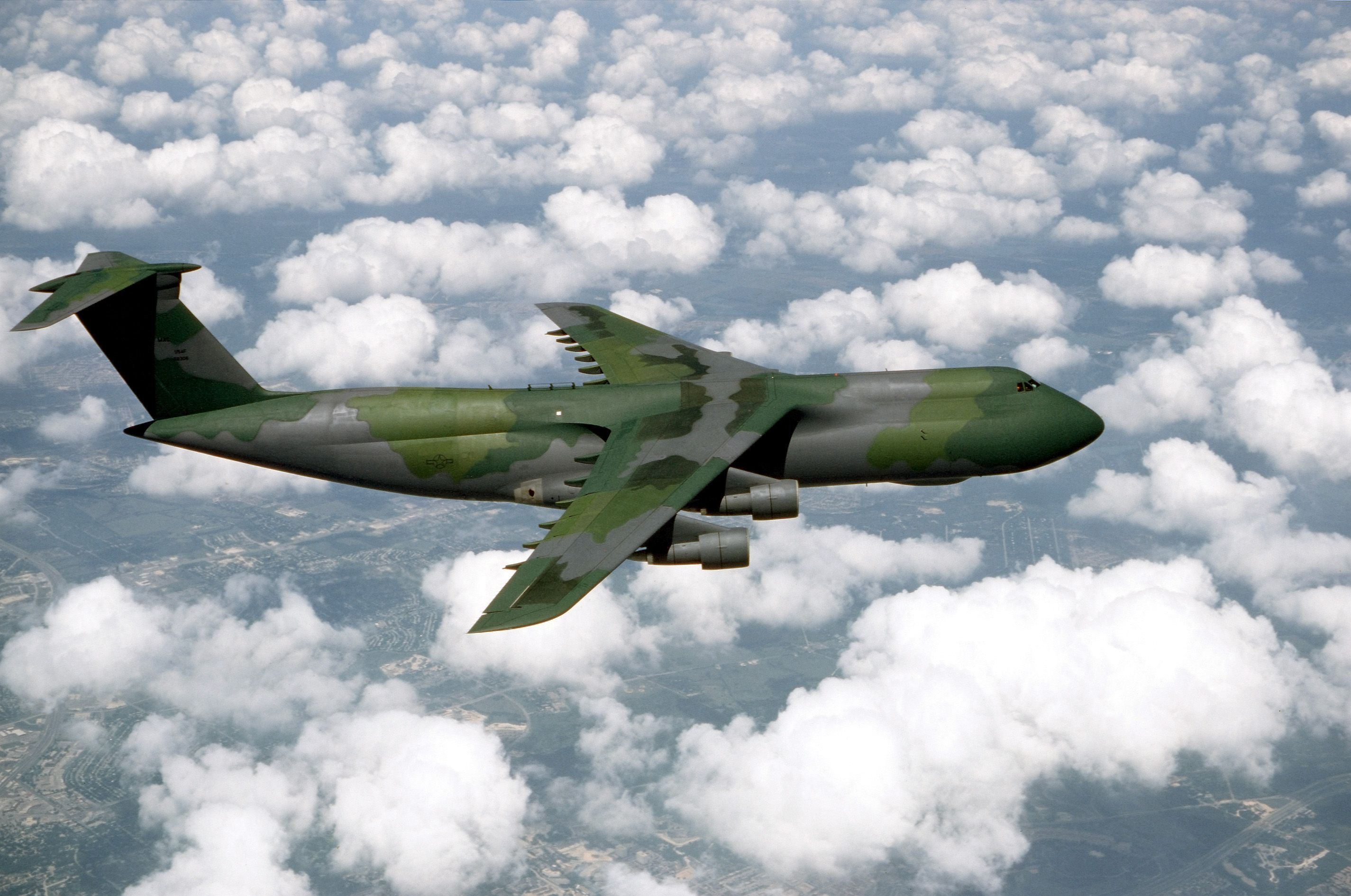
- A 22nd Military Airlift Squadron C-5A Galaxy after being repainted in the European camouflage pattern
- Active: 1942–1946; 1946–1969; 1972–present
- Country: United States
- Branch: United States Air Force
- Role: Strategic Airlift
- Part of: Air Mobility Command
- Garrison/HQ: Travis Air Force Base, California
- Nicknames: Mulies, Double Deuce
- Engagements: World War II (Asia-Pacific Theater) Korean War

- Decorations: Distinguished Unit Citation (4x) Meritorious Unit Award Air Force Outstanding Unit Award (27x) Philippine Presidential Unit Citation (World War II) Republic of Korea Presidential Unit Citation Republic of Vietnam Gallantry Cross with Palm

Insignia
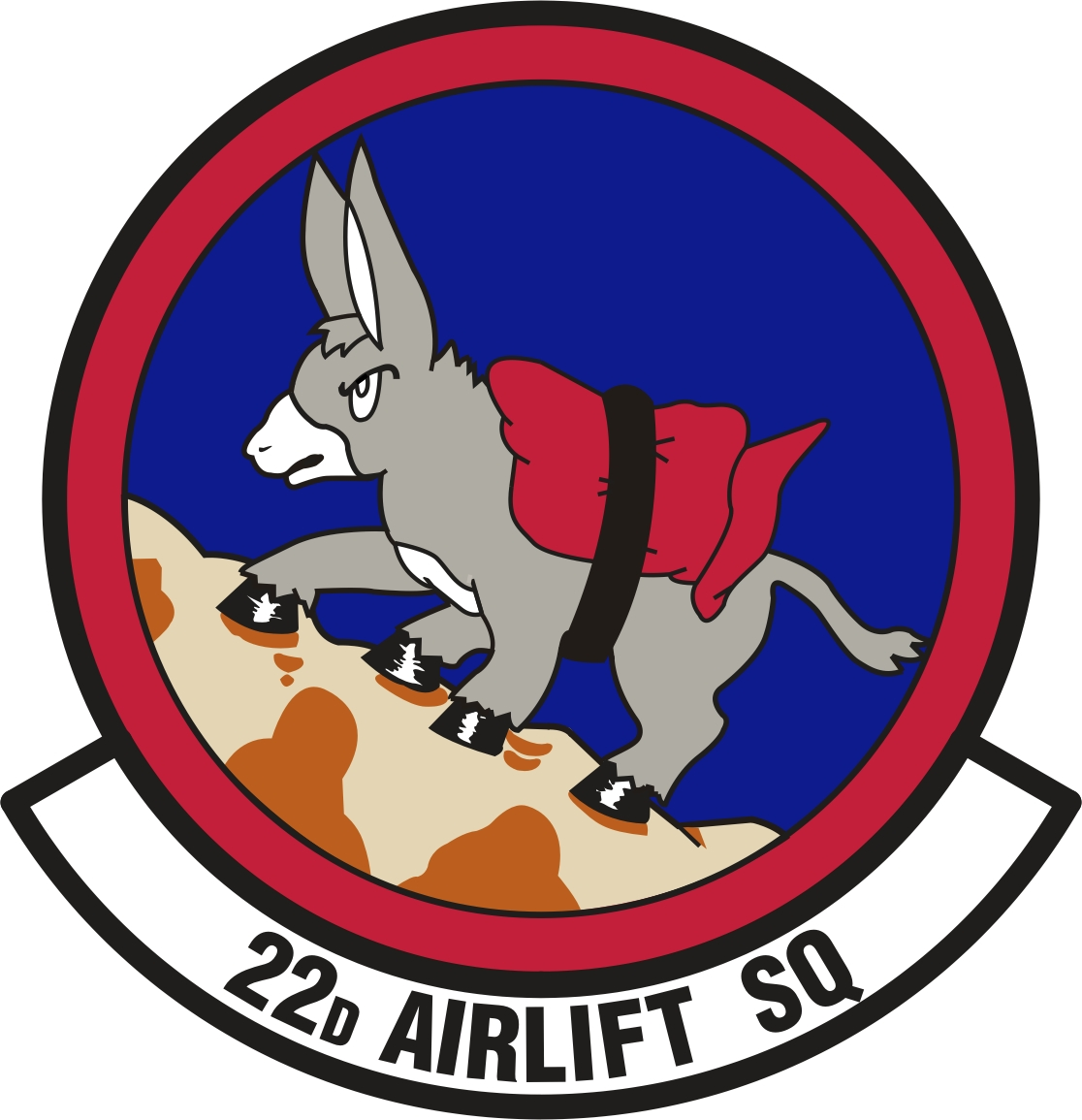
- 22nd Airlift Squadron emblem (approved 17 June 1944)

Aircraft flown
- Transport: Lockheed C-5 Galaxy

The 22nd Airlift Squadron, sometimes written as 22d Airlift Squadron, is part of the 60th Air Mobility Wing at Travis Air Force Base, California. It operates C-5M Galaxy aircraft supporting the United States Air Force global reach mission worldwide. The mission is to provide services and support which promote quality of life and project global power through combat-proven airlift and airdrop.

== History ==
=== World War II ===
The squadron's origins date to the activation of the 22d Transport Squadron at Essendon Airport near Melbourne in the southern fall of 1942. Activated in the wake of the United States withdrawal from the Philippines, the squadron was formed with a mixture of personnel withdrawn from Clark Field and some reinforcements which had arrived in Australia but did not see combat in the Philippines.

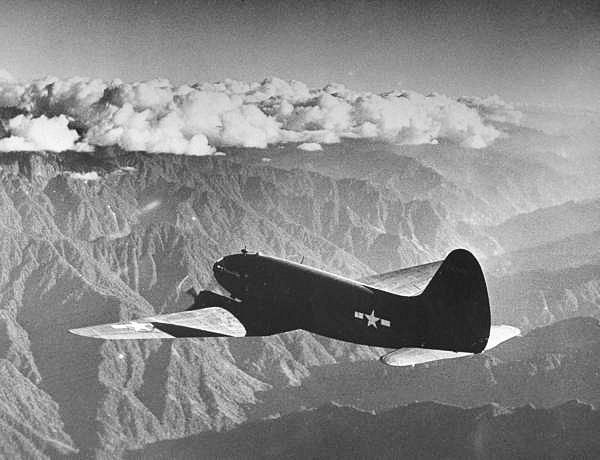
A 22d Troop Carrier Squadron C-46 flying over the Owen Stanley Range, New Guinea, 1943 during the Battle of New Guinea carrying supplies to the combat forces on the north side of the island.

The squadron was hastily put together with some impressed civilian Douglas DC-2s and DC-3s with a mission of transporting personnel, equipment and supplies within Australia, organizing American and Australian forces against the perceived Japanese invasion of Australia.

Over the next few months the squadron was assigned additional aircraft, flying derivatives of the Lockheed C-56 and C-60 Lodestar along with a war-weary four-engine Boeing B-17D Flying Fortress withdrawn from the Philippines and a Douglas B-18 Bolo which had found its way to the South Pacific. The squadron entered combat on 5 July 1942, being redesignated the 22d Troop Carrier Squadron. It participated in a paratroop drops at Nadzab, New Guinea, in September 1942. It continued to fly combat resupply and casualty evacuation missions from Northern Australia until 11 October 1942, when it relocated closer to the fighting front to Garbutt Field, in northern Queensland, not far from Japanese-occupied New Guinea.

In November 1942 the squadron was assigned to the 374th Troop Carrier Group. The 374th was a newly arrived group from the United States equipped with new Douglas C-47 Skytrains. The mixture of aircraft the squadron was formed with were reassigned to other units. With the 374th Group the squadron continued to fly combat missions over New Guinea. On 24 January 1943, the squadron relocated from the Australian mainland to the airfield complex at Port Moresby, New Guinea.

The squadron moved to Finschhafen Airfield in August 1944 to support the Allied effort to push Japanese forces off the island. The fierce fighting in tropical and mountainous New Guinea continued until 1945. It proved to be one of the most important and difficult campaigns in the Pacific War. The 11,000 to 13,000-foot, jungle-clad Owen Stanley Range of New Guinea, known as "the Hump," (Note: Not to be confused with The Hump in the Himalayas between India and China, whose missions were flown primarily by aircraft of Air Transport Command.) was commemorated on the unit emblem, approved on 17 June 1944, and still in use to this day.

In the final month of the Pacific War, the 22d relocated to Nielson Field, Luzon, in the recently liberated Philippines, adding the larger Curtiss C-46 Commando transport plane to its veteran fleet of C-47s. When the Japanese surrendered in August 1945, the squadron was flying combat resupply and support missions from Nielson Field, until it was inactivated at the end of January 1946, its personnel being returned to the United States.

=== Postwar Service and Berlin Airlift ===
However, the need for intratheater transport in the Southwest Pacific led to its reactivation on 15 October 1946 as part of the postwar Thirteenth Air Force, flying C-46s from Nichols Field, Luzon as part of the 374th Troop Carrier Group. With the closure of Nichols Field, the squadron moved to Clark Field and was assigned long-range Douglas C-54 Skymasters for flights to Occupied Japan as well as other destinations in the Southwest Pacific.

In June 1948, in response to the urgent need for C-54 transports in Germany as a result of the Berlin Airlift, the squadron deployed to Wiesbaden Air Base where it flew constant missions in the Berlin Air Corridor to airports in West Berlin and back to Wiesbaden. It remained in Germany for almost a year until the end of the airlift, when it returned to the Pacific, although at Tachikawa Air Base, Japan, which was developed as a transport hub for military airlift into Occupied Japan. With its move to Tachikawa, the squadron was redesignated the 22d Troop Carrier Squadron, Heavy.

=== Korean War ===
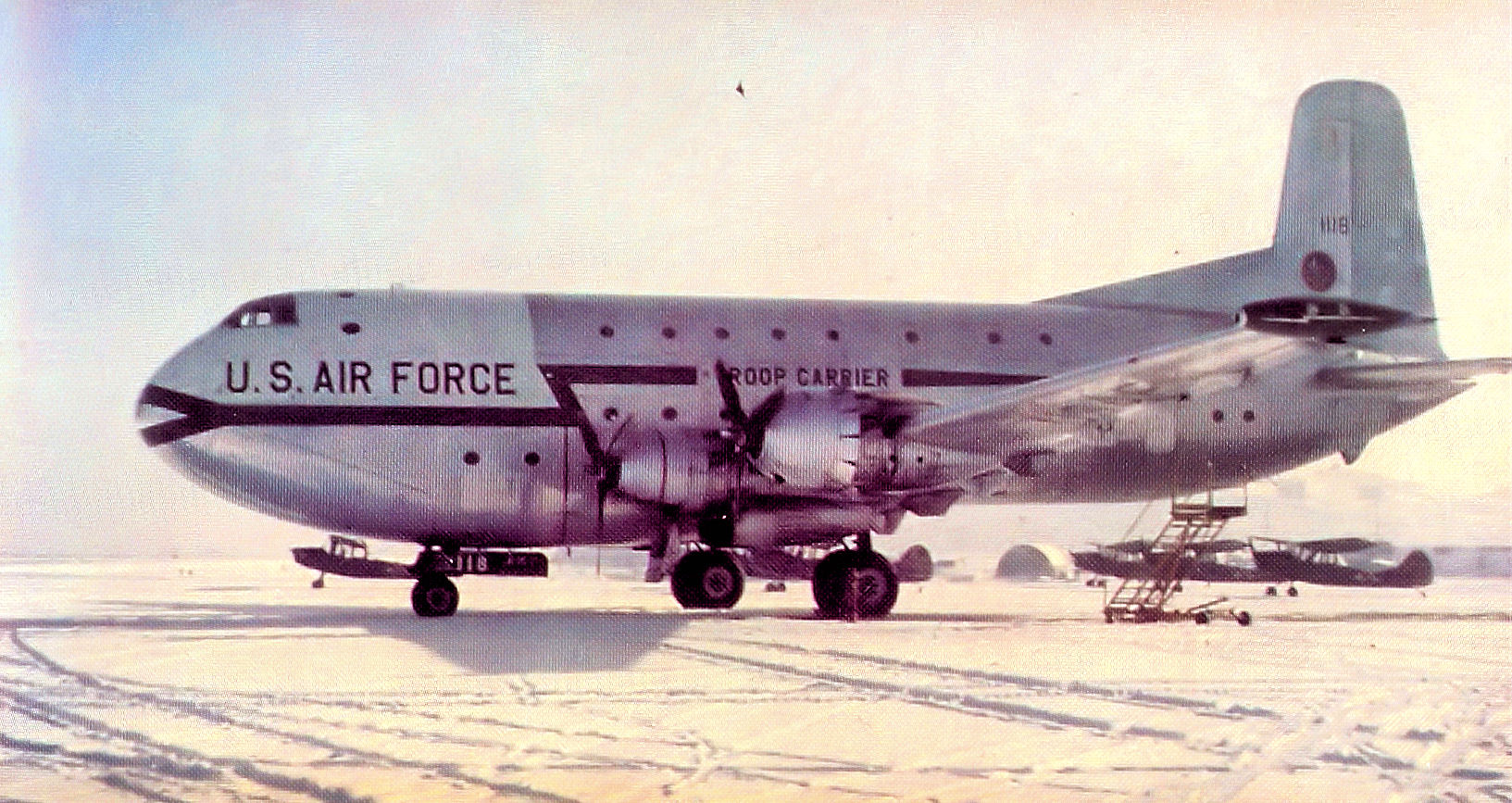
22d Squadron C-124 Globemaster at a snowy airfield (Note: Aircraft is Douglas C-124A-DL Globemaster II serial 51–118, 1952.)

When the Korean War broke out in June 1950, the squadron flew thousands of missions across the Sea of Japan in direct support of United Nations troops fighting the Communist-backed invasion of South Korea. Its C-46s flew into rough combat airfields with ordnance, supplies, gasoline and other materiel to support units in the field. Its C-54s flew into Kimpo Air Base and other permanent airfields, flying in equipment and evacuating casualties to hospitals in Japan. In 1952, the squadron was re-equipped with the Douglas C-124 Globemaster II intercontinental airlifter. From its base at Tachikawa, the squadron began flying trans-Pacific missions to Hawaii, along with flights to Military Air Transport Service (MATS) bases at McChord Air Force Base, Washington and Travis Air Force Base, California. It transported combat wounded and other personnel back to the United States, and personnel, equipment and supplies from the US to Japan.

=== Pacific airlift ===
After the Korean War ended in August 1953, the 22d continued its mission of providing C-124 airlift throughout the Far East from Tachikawa during the 1950s. The unit was not operational between June 1957 and February 1959. In November 1958, the squadron was transferred from Pacific Air Forces to MATS as part of a re-alignment of airlift units. Beginning on 4 August 1964, the 22d began flying missions into South Vietnam and Thailand in support of the escalating conflict in Vietnam as part of the 1503d Air Transport Group and the 65th Military Airlift Group. As part of an Air Force-wide redesignation of transport units as part of the inactivation of MATS and the establishment of Military Airlift Command (MAC), the 22d was redesignated the 22d Military Airlift Squadron. It continued flying combat support missions into Southeast Asia from Tachikawa along with trans-Pacific flights to the United States until June 1969 when it was inactivated as part of the retirement of the C-124 and a general budget reduction with the new Nixon Administration.

=== Reactivation in California ===
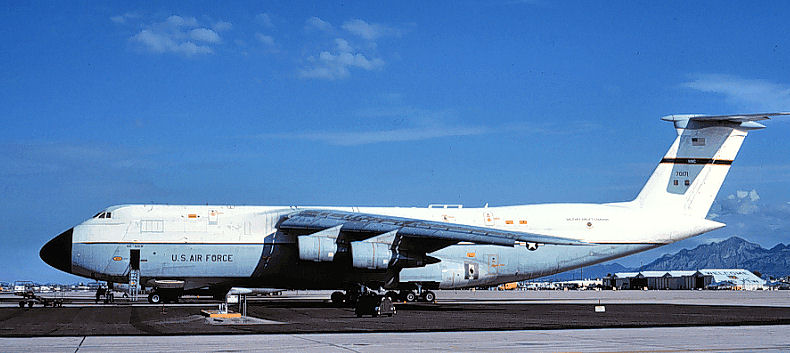
Lockheed C-5A Galaxy 68-10 of the 60th Military Airlift Wing in 1970s livery.

The squadron, however, was not inactive long. It was reactivated at Travis Air Force Base, California on 8 February 1972 as part of the 60th Military Airlift Wing. The 22d was equipped with new Lockheed C-5A Galaxy heavy airlifters and returned to its previous mission of intercontinental air transport of personnel, supplies and equipment. It has continued its mission for the past 40+ years from Travis flying the Galaxy worldwide. With its activation, the 22d and its sister C-5 squadron, the 75th Military Airlift Squadron supported the United States operations in Southeast Asia. It returned US servicemen and equipment from Indochina in the wake of the 1973 Paris Peace Accords, which ended United States involvement in the war. However, squadron aircraft returned to South Vietnam in April 1975 as part of Operation Baby Lift, the evacuation of children and infants from the combat area near Saigon. Unfortunately, a squadron aircraft was lost as part of the operation, killing the crew and many of the passengers (including infants).

After Vietnam, the squadron returned to normal peacetime operations through the 1970s and early 1980s, supporting United States initiatives throughout the world by airlifting passengers, equipment and materiel wherever needed. The squadron briefly returned to combat duty in October 1983, when it supported combat operations in Grenada as part of Operation Urgent Fury and airlifted combat personnel to the island and assisted in the evacuation of American civilian medical students back to the United States.

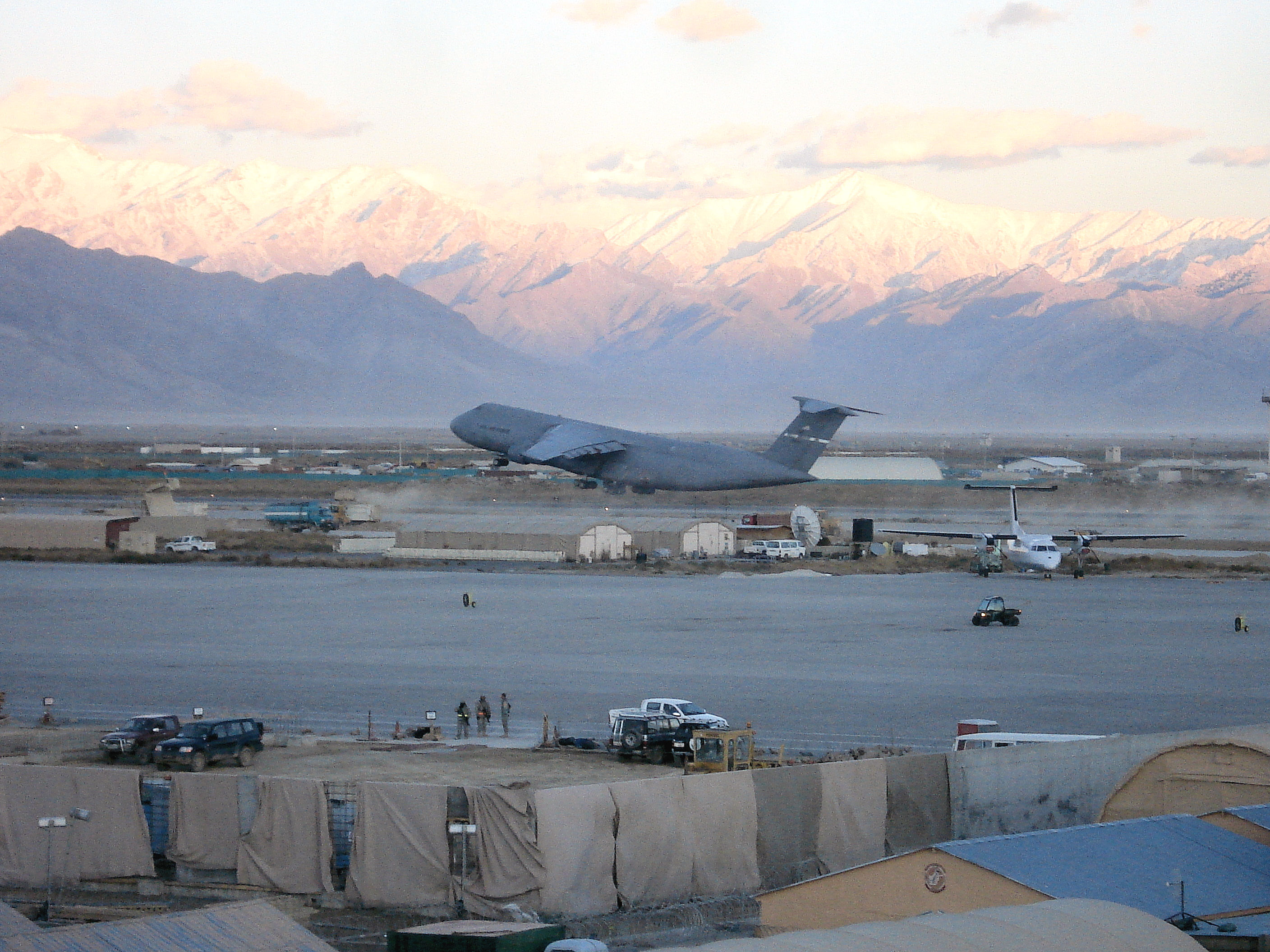
A C-5 Galaxy takes off from a runway at Bagram Air Base, Afghanistan.

In December 1989, the 22d participated in Operation Just Cause, which ended the dictatorship of Panama's Gen. Manuel Noriega. In August 1990, the unit provided strategic airlift in support of the massive coalition forces buildup in Southwest Asia prior to Operations Desert Shield; Operation Desert Storm and Operation Southern Watch. These operations helped contain the expansionist policies of Iraqi president Sadaam Hussein. In the wake of the 1991 Gulf War, the squadron also supported Operation Provide Comfort for Kurdish refugees (1991 to 1996) for Kurdish refugees threatened by Iraqi forces

The 22d was redesignated the 22d Airlift Squadron on 1 November 1991. Humanitarian operations were carried out by the 22d during Operation Fiery Vigil (1991), the evacuation of military personnel from Clark Air Base and their families from the Philippines following the Mt. Pinatubo eruption, and Operations Provide Relief and Restore Hope (1992 to 1993), aiding thousands of famine victims in Somalia. In 1992 and 1993, the squadron provided airlift support to the Balkans peacekeeping missions beginning in 1995 with Operation Joint Endeavor, and continuing under Operations Joint Guardian and Joint Forge.

Since 9/11, the 22d has provided vital strategic airlift in support of allied forces in Southwest Asia participating in Operations Enduring Freedom, Iraqi Freedom, and New Dawn. In July 2002, a crew from the 782nd Expeditionary Airlift Squadron, consisting of members of the 22d and from Dover Air Force Base, made history when they conducted the first deployment in a combat environment of a C-5 aircraft by extracting a Canadian Forces infantry regiment and their equipment from a combat zone near Kandahar, Afghanistan.

== Lineage ==
- 22d Transport Squadron activated in Australia on 3 April 1942, prior to constitution on 4 April 1942

Redesignated 22d Troop Carrier Squadron on 5 July 1942
Inactivated on 31 January 1946

- Activated on 15 October 1946

Redesignated 22d Troop Carrier Squadron, Heavy on 21 May 1948
Redesignated 22d Military Airlift Squadron on 8 January 1966
Inactivated on 8 June 1969

- Activated on 8 February 1972

Redesignated 22d Airlift Squadron on 1 November 1991.

=== Assignments ===
- Air Transport Command, US Army Forces in Australia (later, Air Carrier Service, Air Service Command, Fifth Air Force), 3 April 1942
- 374th Troop Carrier Group, 12 November 1942 – 31 January 1946
- 374th Troop Carrier Group, 15 October 1946 (attached to 317th Troop Carrier Group, 19 September-16 November 1948; 317th Troop Carrier Wing, 3 February 1956 – 30 June 1957)
- 1503d Air Transport Wing, 18 November 1958
- 1503d Air Transport Group, 22 June 1964
- 65th Military Airlift Group, 8 January 1966 – 8 June 1969
- 60th Military Airlift Wing, 8 February 1972
- 60th Military Airlift Group, 6 March 1978
- 60th Military Airlift Wing, 15 February 1979
- 60th Operations Group, 1 Nov 1991–present

=== Stations ===
- Essendon Airport, Melbourne, Australia, 3 April 1942
- Garbutt Field, Australia, 11 October 1942
- Port Moresby Airfield Complex, New Guinea, 24 January 1943
- Garbutt Field, Australia, 4 October 1943
- Finschhafen Airfield, New Guinea, 29 August 1944
- Nielson Field, Luzon, Philippines, August 1945 – 31 January 1946
- Nichols Field, Luzon, Philippines, 15 October 1946
- Clark Field, Luzon, Philippines, 23 April 1947 (deployed to Wiesbaden Air Base, Germany after 18 September 1948)
- Tachikawa Air Base, Japan, 16 November 1948 – 8 June 1969
- Travis Air Force Base, California, 8 February 1972–present

=== Aircraft ===
- Douglas C-39 (1942)
- Douglas C-49 (1942)
- Douglas C-53 Skytrooper (1942)
- Lockheed C-56 Lodestar (1942)
- Lockheed C-60 Lodestar II (1942)
- Boeing B-17 Flying Fortress (1942)
- Douglas B-18 Bolo (1942)
- Douglas C-47 Skytrain (1942–1945)
- Curtiss C-46 Commando (1945–1946, 1946–1949)
- Douglas C-54 Skymaster (1946–1948, 1949–1952)
- Douglas C-124 Globemaster II (1952–1957, 1959–1969)
- Lockheed C-5 Galaxy (1972 – present)
