= 33rd Troop Carrier Squadron =

33d Troop Carrier Squadron (currently Air Mobility Command Test and Evaluation Squadron)
- Active: 1942–1946; 1994-present
- Country: United States
- Branch: United States Air Force
- Role: Test and evaluation
- Part of: Air Mobility Command
- Garrison/HQ: McGuire Air Force Base
- Engagements: Southwest Pacific Theater
- Decorations: Distinguished Unit Citation; Air Force Organizational Excellence Award; Philippine Presidential Unit Citation

Insignia
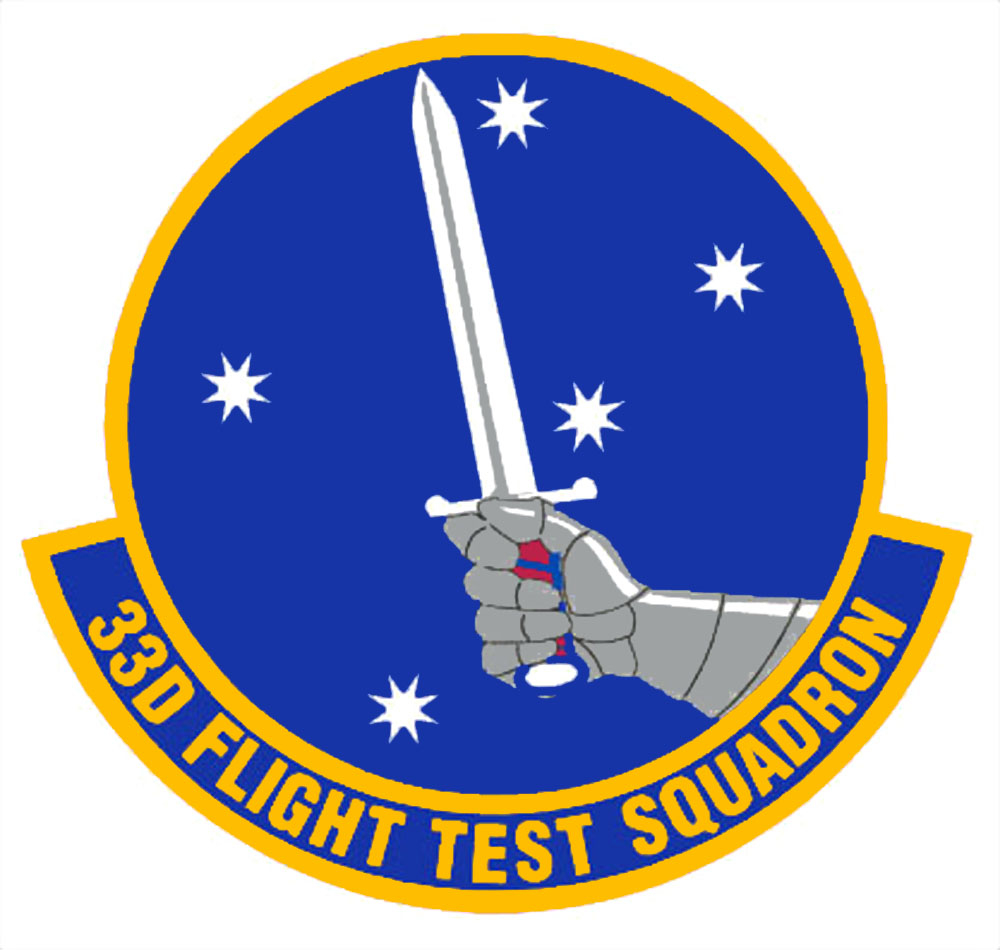
- Air Mobility Command Test & Evaluation Squadron emblem (Note: Approved 29 March 1995.)

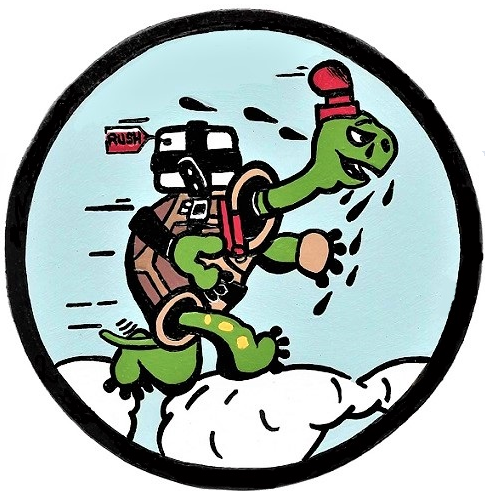
- 33rd Troop Carrier Squadron emblem

The 33d Troop Carrier Squadron is an active United States Air Force unit, redesignated as the Air Mobility Command Test and Evaluation Squadron. It is assigned to the Air Mobility Command. During the Second World War the squadron with the 374th Troop Carrier Group, based at Nielson Field, Luzon, Philippines. It was last activated on 1 October 1994.

== History ==
=== Formation and training ===
On 14 February 1942, the 33d Transport Squadron was activated at Middletown Air Depot, Pennsylvania and became a unit of the 315th Transport Group. The original cadre was selected from the 2nd Transport Squadron, with First Lieutenant Elmer F. Estrumse, from the 6th Transport Squadron, in command. Shortly after activation, the squadron began to operate with Douglas C-39s, loaned by the 2nd Transport Squadron, hauling cargo from Middletown to widely scattered points in the United States and Newfoundland, Haiti, Cuba, and other foreign air fields. The squadron's first plane, a Douglas C-53 Skytrooper, was assigned during the first week of June 1942.

On 17 June 1942, the squadron moved to Bowman Field, Kentucky. An influx of personnel increased the organization from a cadre to approximately half its T/O strength. The organization continued to haul cargo to diverse points while at Bowman Field, and, in addition, instituted an extensive training program for both flying and ground personnel. Training for pilots and enlisted men began for the operation of Douglas C-47 Skytrain transport aircraft. In early July 1942, the squadron was redesignated the 33rd Troop Carrier Squadron.

On 3 August 1942, the squadron moved from Bowman Field, Kentucky to the Florence Army Air Field, South Carolina. The movement was completed on 5 August. The squadron began to gather its required strength of pilots and enlisted man as combat crews, and its allotted quota of aircraft. An intensive overseas training program was immediately undertaken. Flying personnel engaged in night flying and dropped paratroopers in southern maneuvers. Ground personnel were given infantry and commando training. While at Florence, the number of aircraft in the unit was raised to a maximum of thirteen. The squadron sustained its first loss of personnel when Sergeant Joseph Archembault died on 29 August 1942, at Florence, S.C., as a result of injuries received in a motor vehicle accident.

In September 1942, seventy-two officers and enlisted men formed an air echelon and departed for Hamilton Field, California, for overseas transition training. Two weeks later, on 20 October 1942, the ground echelon departed Florence by rail, arriving at its destination, Pittsburg, California, on 27 October 1942.

On 18 October 1942, the air echelon, under the command of Captain Eugene R. Jackson, departed Hamilton Field with thirteen planes headed for the Southwest Pacific. Upon arrival at Canton Island, the evening of 21 October 1942, ten planes and crews assisted for two days in the search for Eddie Rickenbacker, whose Boeing B-17 Flying Fortress had ditched in the Pacific. The ground echelon departed the Golden Gate early on the morning of 3 November 1942 aboard the War Shipping Administration transport MS Tjisdane; arrived in Auckland, New Zealand on 22 November where it remained for four days, arriving at Brisbane, Australia on 1 December.

=== Operations from Australia ===
The first elements of the air echelon arrived in the Southwest Pacific Theater on 25 October 1942. Seven of the squadron's planes and crews were delayed at New Caledonia until 29 November 1942 to ferry personnel and supplies to Guadalcanal and New Hebrides Islands, using Tontouta Airfield as a base. Wounded personnel were returned from Guadalcanal. Here the squadron sustained its first casualties in the Southwest Pacific Area. On 8 November 1942, a C-47 with S/Sgt. Pilot Ray V. Hensman at the controls, was seen to burst into flame after takeoff, as it passed over the northerly end of Henderson Field, Guadalcanal, then in the hands of the Japanese. It has been struck by enemy ground fire. Two weeks later, on 22 November 1942, another plane was totally demolished in a take-off crash at New Hebrides carrying a load of hand grenades. the crew was seriously injured, but there were no fatalities. On 29 November, the five remaining planes departed Tontouta, joining the rest of the air echelon at Wards Airfield, Port Moresby, New Guinea on 2 December 1942.

The remaining six planes continued on to Brisbane, Queensland, thence to Cairns Airport, Queensland, and operated from there and New Guinea until 10 December 1942 when they were sent to their permanent station in New Guinea. On the first of November these six planes began to operate from Port Moresby in support of the Papua and Buna New Guinea action.

The ground echelon arrived at Brisbane on 1 December. Billeted at Camp Doomben, three weeks elapsed during which training was continued (hikes, drill, weapons instructions, etc.) The squadron embarked on the supply ship SS Isaac Coles on 21 December. There were no troop facilities on board, and the men slept in one of the holds on strips of plywood laid on the floor. Strict smoking orders were enforced since there were thousands of tons of live ammunition, torpedoes, and bombs on board. After a seven-day strenuous trip, Port Moresby was reached on 28 December 1942. The meeting of the air and ground echelons was a never-to-be-forgotten moment. The ground echelon was informed that although an area had been assigned, no camp had been established. The air echelon had slept in the planes, eating cold C-rations or eating occasionally at Camp Arcadia whose small kitchen appeared to be the only one on the island. The men immediately set up pup tents and prepared sites for permanent quarters to be put up as soon as the pyramidal tents would be unloaded from the boat.

The unit was notified that it had become a part of the newly designated 374th Troop Carrier Group, pursuant to General Order No. 32, Hq. Fifth Air Force, 12 November 1942, which was being built up in Brisbane.

During this month, two of the six aircraft, with crews, were lost. Nine enlisted men had been killed and one officer and two enlisted men were missing. One loss was the result of an attack by Japanese Zeros, while the other crashed in the Owen Stanley Range. Of the latter, on 10 November 1942, "The Flying Dutchman," loaded with 20 Americans of the 126th Infantry Regiment crashed near Dobodura Airfield, New Guinea. Second Lieutenant George W. Vandervort and Sgt. Steven J. Pitch were killed, while Sgt. George R. Kershner, radio operator, was miraculously spared. Sgt. Kershner wandered through the New Guinea jungles for 38 days before he was rescued. Remains of Sgt. Pitch and nine infantrymen were recovered in July 1944.

During the month of January 1943, the war was brought to the men in the form of air raids. These raids resulted in little damage but they did manage to keep the men up most of the night. During these early months, a dispute arose as to who was commanding officer of the squadron. Captain Eugene R. Jackson had been placed in command of the air echelon at Hamilton Field by order of the I Troop Carrier Command at Indianapolis, Indiana. At about the same time, Captain Robert L. Ward was also assigned to the squadron at Florence and placed in command by order of the commanding officer of the 315th Troop Carrier Group. The issue was settled by the commanding officer, 314th Troop Carrier Group. His decision placed Captain Ward in command. His tenure of office was short due to the early promotion of Captain Jackson to major.

The air echelon had welcomed the arrival of the ground echelon for they had been flying daily, without rest, since their departure from the states. Now they would be able to get more rest because of the crew members who had come over with the ground echelon. Their exuberance was short lived for the battle for the Wau Airport was in process and all the unit's planes were busy flying in Australian troops until the Japanese were eventually driven out, in February.

It was during the height of this battle that another of our planes was lost to enemy action. On 1 February 1943, several flights of the squadron's planes reached the Wau airstrip simultaneously with 20 Japanese bombers and several fighters. The bombers dropped their loads on the strip and the fighters took after the squadron's aircraft. All escaped except for "Early Delivery," piloted by Lt. Robert H. Schwensen. The plane was last seen with two Zeros on its tail. Coincident with the Wau battle, the 33d planes were required to carry supplies to Kokoda, Dobodura, Buna, and dropping missions on the various battle fronts in Papua inaccessible to air strips. Casualties were usually evacuated on the return trips from these strips. The planes, upon approaching Wards Drome, would fly a distinctive colored streamer, indicating wounded aboard, and would be met immediately upon landing by American and Australian ambulances. For its vital part in the Papuan Campaign between 19 September 1942 and 22 December 1942, the 374th Troop Carrier Group was cited in par. III, War Department General Order No.3, 15 January 1943. Also included in citation, lID Co. 1/:21, 6 May 1943.

The 33rd continued to fly unprecedented numbers of troops and tons of supplies to Dobodura and Wau and Bulolo, where the enemy were being gradually pushed back into Salamau and Lae. To the Allied troops on the front lines of this sector, daily dropping missions kept them in supplies and ammunition.

Enemy activity over the Port Moresby area was being gradually reduced to hit and run night raids of one, two and occasionally three planes. Day raids were a thing of the past so personnel had become lax in the upkeep of their slit trenches. This proved to be unfortunate when at 1000 hours on 12 April 1943 forty odd Japanese bombers and sixty-five Zeroes raided Seven Mile Strip and Wards Drome. Personnel on the strip crowded into several culverts. The 33d suffered no damage to installations or equipment.

In July 1943, squadrons of the 375th Troop Carrier Group arrived. The 56th and 58th Troop Carrier Squadrons were attached to the 33d. These squadrons flew operational missions with the 374th Group, and under the guidance of the group's old pilots, built up experience and knowledge necessary for safe flying over the Owen Stanley Range and the southwest Pacific area in general. At the end of the month the 375th Group departed Moresby and moved to Dobodura. Ground and air operations against Lae and Salamua increased in tempo until the early weeks in September when Lae capitulated on the 16th. The group's planes were soon hauling equipment and personnel on a regular shuttle between Moresby and Lae.

=== Return to Australia ===
In October 1943, the entire group moved to Australia. Headquarters and the 6th, 22d and 33d Squadrons went to Townsville and the 21st Squadron to Brisbane. The 33rd made a complete exchange of equipment with the 41st Troop Carrier Squadron of the 317th Troop Carrier Group at Townsville. They in turn moved into the 33d's area at Port Moresby, taking over the equipment left by the 33rd. Although still under the administrative control of the Fifth Air Force, the group was placed under the operational control of the Directorate of Air Transport.

A heavy schedule of operations was undertaken by the group, and men and equipment were moved in a steady flow to all parts of Australia, especially Darwin, Northern Territory and other West Australian military establishments. Another shuttle schedule was made between Moresby and Townsville. To the group also fell the task of ferrying personnel from Moresby to the rest area at Mackay, Queensland. Flights from Townsville were altogether different than those from Moresby. All were at least four hours long. Here the group would take a load to one station, offload, reload and head on flying until darkness or weather forced the crew to remain overnight. While stationed at Townsville, the number of aircraft assigned to the squadron was increased. This enabled the 33d to step up production. Air miles flown and flying hours were almost doubled. This change came without any increase in personnel. Gradually, however, new men were added and manpower problems were overcome. During the period from October 1943 to April 1944, the squadron learned to maintain and operate twice as many aircraft as ever before, and during this period, only one major accident occurred over the Coral Sea probably as the result of bad weather.

=== Return to New Guinea ===
On 14 April 1944 the 33rd moved from Townsville to Port Moresby began and was completed on 16 April, except for heavy vehicles and equipment scheduled to come by boat. On 20 April the organization moved from temporary billets at HQ. Fifth Air Force to the permanent base at the old 54th Troop Carrier Wing area. Camp construction was started immediately. Diligent and cooperative work resulted in one of the best camp areas in New Guinea. Major Wamsley was appointed Base Commander of Wards Airdrome effective 17 April 1944.

In the middle of May 1944, squadron operations, intelligence, and engineering moved from Wards to Jackson Drome. The move involved hauling several buildings approximately a mile and a half. At Wards Drome the Intelligence Department had ample space on the second floor of the Base Operations Building. At Jackson, the space allocated by DAT was so insufficient that it required construction of a new building. New materials being unavailable for construction, salvage from the old 6th and 33d Troop Carrier Squadrons was utilized. An interesting sidelight was the utilization of about 30 transient natives to move an old tent floor, pay being in cigarettes. During the month, in cooperation with Graves Registration and ANGAU, a thorough air search was made of the area in which the "Flying Dutchman" crashed 10 November 1942 in a mountainous region east of Port Moresby. Though there were survivors who eventually reached civilization, the plane has never been located, but another crashed plane hitherto not located was seen and photographed.

For about four days out of the month of July 1944 the 33d flew Jack Benny, Carole Landis, and company to different bases in New Guinea. The highlight of the Communications Section activities for the month was the opening of its Radio Operator's Training School under the supervision of Sgt. Ralph Harmon. The course covered radio repair and maintenance, theory and procedure, as well as the use of code. Training included practice in the air, as well as on the ground.

The squadron moved to Finschhafen Airport. Two detachments (25 enlisted men and 2 officers) departed for Finschhafen on 20 and 21 August 1944. On 22 August the movement orders were postponed by the commanding general of Far East Air Forces (FEAF). Fourteen enlisted men returned to the squadron next day. During September 1944, preparation of the new camp site at Finschhafen progressed favorably in steady rain and mud. The parachute department is the only complete department that moved up to Finschhafen.

Between the 15th through 18 October 1944, the squadron moved to Hollandia. The new camp site, at the base of the Cyclops Mountain Range, was formerly occupied by the 21st Infantry Division. During October, 13 new pilots were received in the squadron. Capt. Claude Patterson, 1st Lt. Eric Pearson and 2d Lt. Richard Bledsoe were the first personnel from the squadron to fly into the Philippines. On 26 November, flying a FEAF Headquarters plane, they took off for Palau and remained overnight there. On the following morning, they took off for Leyte, remained there almost an hour and flew back to Hollandia via Palau.

On 17 December 1944 a new courier run was initiated: Hollandia – Biak – Morotai – Leyte and return. Toward the end of the year the squadron pilot roster increased from about 55 pilots to 105. For the year 1944, the Engineering Section maintained 90 percent of planes in commission, and there were 87 engines changed during the year.

The much expected cancellation of Australian leaves and furloughs for flying personnel came when the leave ship scheduled to take-off on 26 February 1945 was cancelled. Along with this cancellation, word was received that there would be no further vacations to the mainland. The rest area at MacKay was closed. While flying over Mindoro, W-588, piloted by 1st Lieutenant Frank R. Miller, was hit by enemy anti-aircraft fire on 16 February. The right aileron was almost completely shot off and a large hole shot in the right wing. Both aileron and wing had to be replaced. No injuries received by crew. During March 1945, the squadron flew an average of sixteen airplanes a day and logged over 4,000 hours, the equivalent of 600,000 airline miles. The hours flown exceeded those of any single month in squadron history by 750 hours.

=== Operations from the Philippines ===
April 1945 was hardly underway when the squadron received its movement orders to move to Nielson Field, in the Philippine Islands. The organization was relieved from operational flying on the 7th and the first planeload departed at 0600. Aboard were the advance echelon of Lt. Osborne and four enlisted men with their personal equipment. Their specific duty was that of liaison with base officials. The actual movement was begun on the 8th. The advance echelon had set up a few tents just off Nichols strip where the equipment was being unloaded. Planes were unable to land on Nielson since repairs to the strip had not been completed. Lt. Barwick with the aid of several enlisted men, commenced on the 12th to survey and lay out the camp, area. Unnecessary delays were encountered when a shortage of center and corner poles for the tents was discovered. It was possible to put up only fifteen tents. Requisitions were returned "out of stock." The shortage was overcome when 144 poles were borrowed from the 9lst Engineer Battalion. Construction got underway again and six rows of tents, approximately seven tents in each row, were set up. The move was completed by the 20th with exception of three or four loads that was necessary to maintain the small detachment at Hollandia. Two new Curtiss C-46 Commandos were received in April. Until pilots became acquainted with them, they were used for transition only. Mr. Hadely, the Curtiss-Wright representative, gave ground school for engineers and flew with Capt. Samuels and Lt. Thompson explaining and demonstrating flight operations of the Curtiss propellers. The movement of the organization to a civilized area after a protracted stay in New Guinea was responsible for an improvement in morale.

The construction of the new camp area, began in April, was carried on without interruption. Buildings began mushrooming in an orderly fashion all over the area during the month of May 1945. Normal operation of the squadron was disrupted by the defeat of Germany and the subsequent introduction of the redeployment "bombshell". Ninety enlisted men and five officers had Adjusted Service Rating scores above 85. Of this group, 98% had been in the Southwest Pacific Area since November 1942. The remaining 2% attributed their high score to dependent children. The plan was responsible for a terrific upswing in the morale of the men with long overseas service. For the second time in the history of the squadron, an enlisted man was given a direct commission. Master Sergeant Harry Friedman was commissioned a second lieutenant. The only other direct appointment made was in August 1942 at Florence, South Carolina, when Master Sergeant George Conley was commissioned a second lieutenant. The excellent record of the squadron's aircraft during this period reflected Friedman's tireless efforts toward maintaining the desired degree of efficiency of maintenance. Within a few days of his appointment, Lt. Friedman was transferred to the 333d Depot Repair Squadron, 4th Air Depot Group in Manila. Three C-46 aircraft were received during the month making a total of five in the squadron.

During June 1945, "Redeployment and Readjustment" assumed the position of highest importance to the personnel of the unit. The first quota was announced on 16 June—two men, S/Sgt. Preston H. Yawn with a score of 126 and Sgt. Wallace F. Costello with a score of 123. Morale of the squadron nosedived since everyone had anticipated a much larger quota as the 374th Group was the original and oldest troop carrier organization in the Southwest Pacific Area. A total of 17 men had over 100 points. S/Sgt. James J. Murphy, Cpl, Francis H. Emmerich, and Pvt. Orville G. Griffith, the only men eligible under the War Department's announcement of discharging men over 40-year-of-age, were returned to the United States. During July 1945, the squadron released thirteen enlisted men under the redeployment policy.

One Vultee BT-13 Valiant was assigned to the squadron to be used as an instrument trainer. On 27 July the BT-13 was demolished in a landing accident when it struck construction equipment at the end of the runway. A North American B-25 Mitchell was also received to be used for a food ship. A considerable amount of work was done on this ship. All paint was removed and all moveable surfaces were replaced with new surfaces. Nielson Field became exceedingly congested, resulting in traffic blocks that kept aircraft attached to the squadron from getting off on time.

In August 1945 all hostilities ceased in the Southwest Pacific Area. The effect this news had on the men in the squadron was one of relief, but not great exuberance. On 31 August the squadron lost a C-46 aircraft missing on a routine flight from Morotai, Halmahera to Nielson Field. One night courier and one day courier schedule to Okinawa was added. The Japanese acceptance of Allied surrender terms in August alerted the Intelligence Department to preparing maps to Formosa and Japan. These maps were made ready and were used on 28 August when the squadron's first plane flew into Haneda Airport. This was the sixteenth Allied plane to land in Japan.

The big business for the month of September 1945 was the releasing from the squadron of personnel on the Redeployment System. The aircraft that was listed as missing on a routine flight in August from Morotai, Halmahera to Manila was discovered on 25 September 7 1/2 miles from Del Monte Airfield, where it hit a mountain at very low altitude. All crew members were killed. Courier runs to Tokyo, Morotai, and Del Monte constituted most of the flights for the month. So many key personnel were returned to the United States that the Engineering Section was very shorthanded. This month saw the lowest percentage of planes in commission, 63%, because of the personnel shortage. The 33d Troop Carrier Squadron was inactivated at APO 323 on 15 February 1946.

Some interesting statistics on record flying time, weight hauled, and miles flown by the 33d Troop Carrier Squadron are: Flying Time, 4,039:05 hours in March 1945; Weight Hauled, 6,951,103 pounds in May 1944; and, Miles Flown, 471,474 miles in January 1945.

=== Test operations ===
The squadron was redesignated the 33d Flight Test Squadron and reactivated at what is now Joint Base McGuire-Dix-Lakehurst on 1 October 1994. The squadron was redesignated the Air Mobility Command Test and Evaluation Squadron on 16 October 2003.

== Lineage ==
- Constituted as the 33d Transport Squadron on 2 February 1942

Activated on 14 February 1942
Redesignated 33d Troop Carrier Squadron on 4 July 1942
Inactivated on 15 February 1946
Redesignated 33d Flight Test Squadron on 14 July 1994

- Activated on 1 October 1994

Redesignated Air Mobility Command Test and Evaluation Squadron on 16 October 2003

=== Assignments ===
- 315th Transport Group (later 315th Troop Carrier Group), 14 February 1942
- 374th Troop Carrier Group, 12 November 1942 – 15 February 1946
- Air Mobility Warfare Center, 1 October 1994
- Air Mobility Command, 16 October 2003 – present

=== Stations ===
- Olmsted Field, Pennsylvania, 14 February 1942
- Bowman Field, Kentucky, 17 June 1942
- Florence Army Air Field, South Carolina, 3 August-30 September 1942

Detachments operated from: Plaine Des Gaiacs Airfield, New Caledonia, 25 October-29 November 1942 and Cairns Airport, Queensland, Australia, c. 1 November—10 December 1942

- Archerfield Airport, Brisbane, Australia, 1 December 1942
- Wards Airfield (5 Mile Drome), Port Moresby, New Guinea, 28 December 1942
- RAAF Base Garbutt (Townsville), Australia, 5 October 1943
- Wards Airfield (5 Mile Drome), Port Moresby, New Guinea, April 1944
- Hollandia Airfield Complex, Netherlands East Indies, 15 October 1944
- Nielson Field, Luzon, Philippines, 18 April 1945 – 15 February 1946
- Fort Dix Air Installation, New Jersey, 1 Oct 1994
- McGuire Air Force Base, New Jersey, 19 Nov 2004 – present

=== Aircraft ===
- Douglas C-39, 1942
- Douglas C-53 Skytrooper, 1942
- Douglas C-47 Skytrain, 1942–1946
- Curtiss C-46 Commando, 1945–1946.
- Vultee BT-13 Valiant, 1945
- North American B-25 Mitchell, 1945–1946
- Lockheed C-141 Starlifter, 1994–2003
- Boeing KC-135 Stratotanker, 1994–2003
- Lockheed C-5 Galaxy, 1994–2003
- Boeing C-17 Globemaster III, 1995–2003

=== Commanding officers during World War II ===
- 1st Lt. Elmer F. Estrumse – 17 Feb. 42
- 1st Lt. Campbell N. Smith – 1 Sep. 42
- Capt. George C. Kimball – 30 Sep. 42 (Acting CO, Ground Echelon)
- Capt. Robert L. Ward – 7 Oct. 42 (Ground Echelon)
- Capt. Eugene R. Jackson – 11 Oct. 42
- Capt. Eugene R. Jackson – 28 Dec. 42 (complete command)
- Capt. George W. Wamsley Jr. – 15 Oct. 43
- Capt. Robert E. Carlson – 17 Jul. 44
- Capt. William J. Samuels – 28 Jan. 45
- Capt. Robert T. Best – 19 May 45
- 2d Lt. Fred Zorn – 2 Jan 46 to 15 Feb 46 (Acting CO)
