= 6th Airlift Squadron =

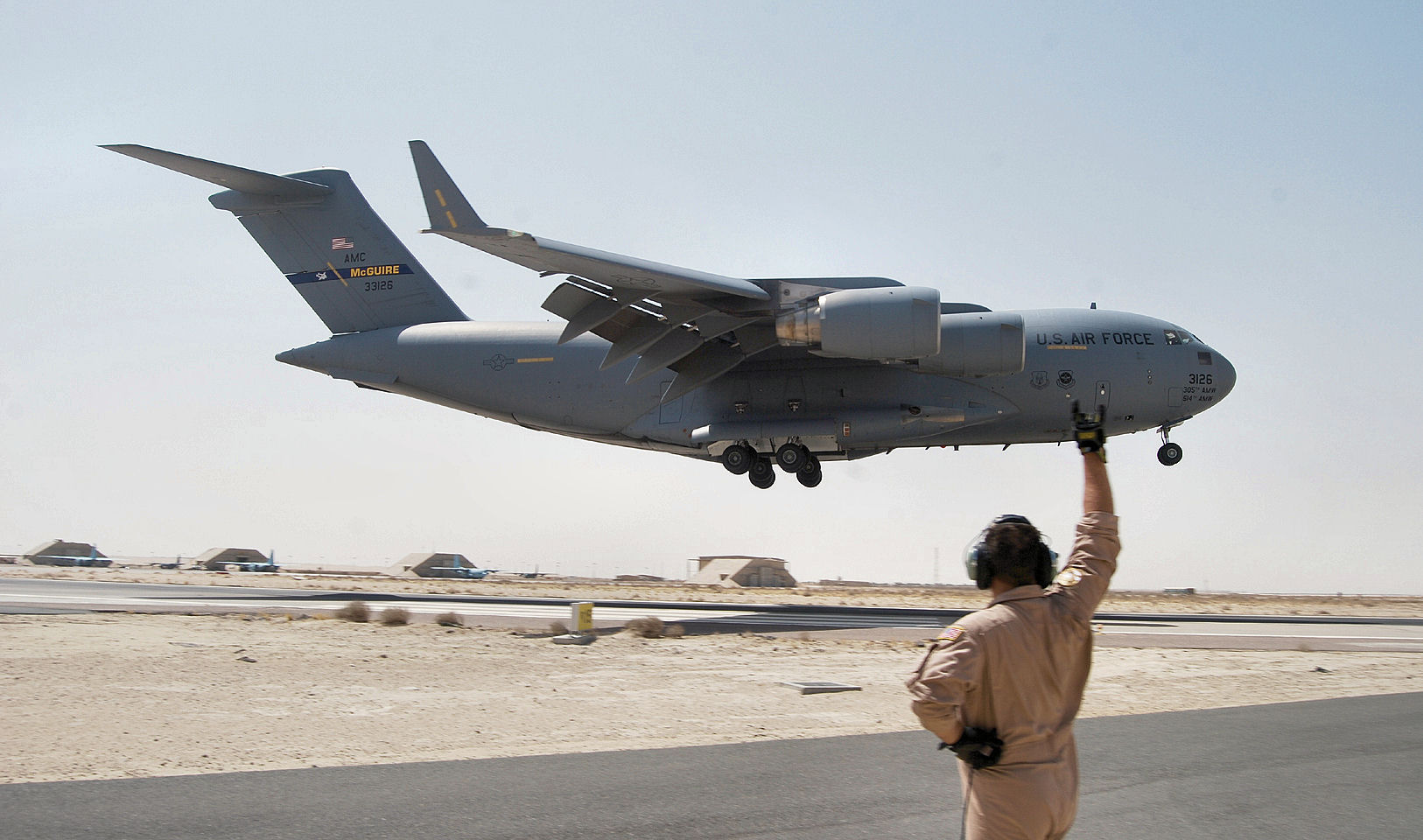
- 6th Airlift Squadron C-17A Globemaster III landing at an airfield in Iraq (Note: Aircraft is Boeing C-17A Globemaster III Lot XV, serial 03-3126)
- Active: 1939–1968; 1970–present
- Country: United States
- Branch: United States Air Force
- Role: Strategic Airlift
- Part of: 305th Operations Group
- Nickname(s): Bully Beef Express
- Engagements: Southwest Pacific Theater Korean War Southwest Asia Service: Defense of Saudi Arabia; Liberation and Defense of Kuwait; Armed Forces Expeditionary: Operation Just Cause

- Decorations: Distinguished Unit Citation (4x) Air Force Outstanding Unit Award (14x) Republic of Korea Presidential Unit Citation Republic of Vietnam Gallantry Cross with Palm

Insignia
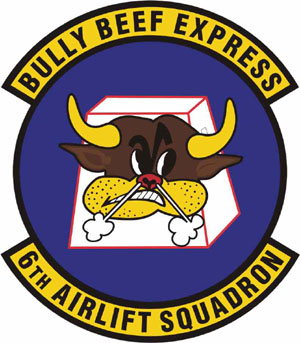
- 6th Airlift Squadron emblem (approved 1 December 1952)

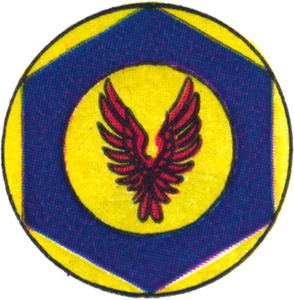
- 6th Troop Carrier Squadron emblem (approved 4 April 1942)

The 6th Airlift Squadron is part of the 305th Air Mobility Wing at the McGuire AFB section of Joint Base McGuire-Dix-Lakehurst, New Jersey. It operates the Boeing C-17 Globemaster III supporting the United States Air Force global reach mission worldwide. The main base and the flying squadron are located near the borough of Wrightstown, New Jersey.

== Mission ==
Train and equip Boeing C-17 Globemaster III aircrews for global airland operations.

== History ==
=== World War II ===
The squadron was constituted in a major Army reorganization of October 1933. Still, it was not activated until 1939, shortly after World War II had begun in Europe and the Air Corps began to expand. The squadron was allotted to the Fourth Corps Area and partly organized by July 1934 with reserve personnel at Shreveport, Louisiana, and assigned to the 2d Transport Group. On 5 June 1936, the unit was allotted to the Fifth Corps Area and again organized with reserve personnel at Columbus, Ohio by August 1937. All reserve personnel were withdrawn from the squadron in October 1939.

The squadron was activated on 14 October 1939 at Olmsted Field, Pennsylvania, and assigned to the 10th Transport Group. Relieved from the 10th Transport Group on 1 December 1940 and assigned to the 60th Transport Group. Relieved from the 60th Transport Group on 19 May 1941 and assigned to the 61st Transport Group.

The squadron made airlift history during World War II when, in October 1942, it moved to Port Moresby, New Guinea. Then flying Douglas C-47 Skytrains, the 6th became the first personnel transport squadron to fly in the Pacific. During this assignment, the squadron earned the nickname Bully Beef Express, as it carried tons of boiled beef to allied combat troops in Australia and New Guinea. The French called it "bouilli boeuf, " The term's Americanized version has continued to be the squadron's emblem.

The 6th performed aerial transportation in the Pacific Theater and Southwest Pacific Theater during World War II and in the Far East during the Korean War and after until 1968.

=== Strategic airlift ===
It has performed worldwide airlift operations since April 1970. The 6th conducted resupply missions in support of scientific stations in the Antarctic during Operation Deep Freeze from 1971 to 1974. It resupplied Israel during the 1973 Yom Kippur War. It evacuated Vietnamese refugees during the fall of Saigon in April through June 1975. It also supported U.S. forces in Grenada from October to December 1983, the invasion of Panama from December 1989 to January 1990, and the liberation of Kuwait from August 1990 to March 1991.

== Lineage ==
- Constituted as the 6th Transport Squadron on 1 October 1933

Organized with reserve personnel by July 1934 (remained inactive)
Activated on 14 October 1939
Redesignated 6th Troop Carrier Squadron on 4 July 1942
Redesignated 6th Troop Carrier Squadron, Heavy on 21 May 1948
Redesignated 6th Military Airlift Squadron on 8 January 1966
Discontinued and inactivated on 8 June 1968

- Activated on 8 April 1970

Redesignated 6th Airlift Squadron on 1 November 1991

=== Assignments ===
- 2d Transport Group, 1 October 1933 (in inactive status)
- 10th Transport Group, 14 October 1939
- 60th Transport Group, 1 December 1940
- 61st Transport Group, 19 May 1941
- 315th Transport Group, March 1942
- 63d Transport Group (later 63d Troop Carrier Group), June 1942
- 374th Troop Carrier Group, 12 November 1942
- 403d Troop Carrier Group, 15 May 1946
- 374th Troop Carrier Group, 15 October 1946
- 1503d Air Transport Wing, 18 November 1958
- 1502d Air Transport Wing, 22 June 1964
- 61st Military Airlift Wing, 8 January 1966 – 8 June 1968
- 438th Military Airlift Wing, 8 April 1970
- 438th Military Airlift Group, 1 October 1978
- 438th Military Airlift Wing, 1 June 1980
- 438th Operations Group, 1 November 1991
- 305th Operations Group, 1 October 1994 – present

=== Stations ===
- Shreveport, Louisiana, by July 1934 – 5 June 1936 (in inactive status)
- Cleveland, Ohio, by August 1937 – 14 October 1939 (in inactive status)
- Olmsted Field, Pennsylvania, 14 October 1939
- Camp Williams, Wisconsin, 23 March 1942
- Dodd Field, Texas, 16–23 September 1942
- Port Moresby Airfield Complex, New Guinea, 13 October 1942
- Garbutt Field, Australia, 2 October 1943
- Nadzab Airfield Complex, New Guinea, c. 26 August 1944
- Mokmer Airfield, Biak, Pampa New Guinea, c. 20 October 1944
- Tacloban Airfield, Leyte, c. 12 March 1945
- Nielson Field, Luzon, 1 January 1946
- Okinawa, 10 June 1946
- Tachikawa Air Base, Japan, 13 April 1947
- Harmon Field, Guam, 1 December 1947
- Tachikawa Air Base, Japan, 5 March 1949
- Hickam Air Force Base, Hawaii, 22 June 1964 – 8 June 1968
- McGuire Air Force Base, New Jersey, 8 April 1970 – present

=== Aircraft ===
- Douglas C-33, 1940–1942
- Douglas C-39, 1940–1942
- Douglas C-53 Skytrooper, 1941–1942
- Douglas C-47 Skytrain, 1942–1945
- Curtiss C-46 Commando, 1945–1947
- Douglas C-54 Skymaster, 1946–1952
- Douglas C-124 Globemaster II, 1952–1968
- Lockheed C-141 Starlifter, 1970–2004
- Boeing C-17 Globemaster III, 2004–present
