= 374th Operations Group =

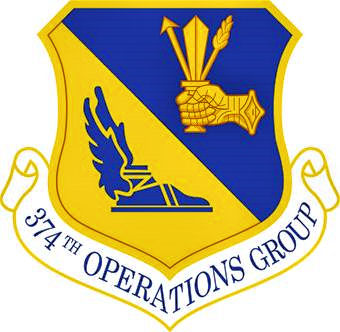
- Emblem of the 374th Operations Group
- Active: 1943–1946; 1946–1958; 1966–present
- Country: United States
- Branch: United States Air Force
- Garrison/HQ: Yokota Air Base, Western Tokyo, Japan
- Engagements: World War II; Korean War

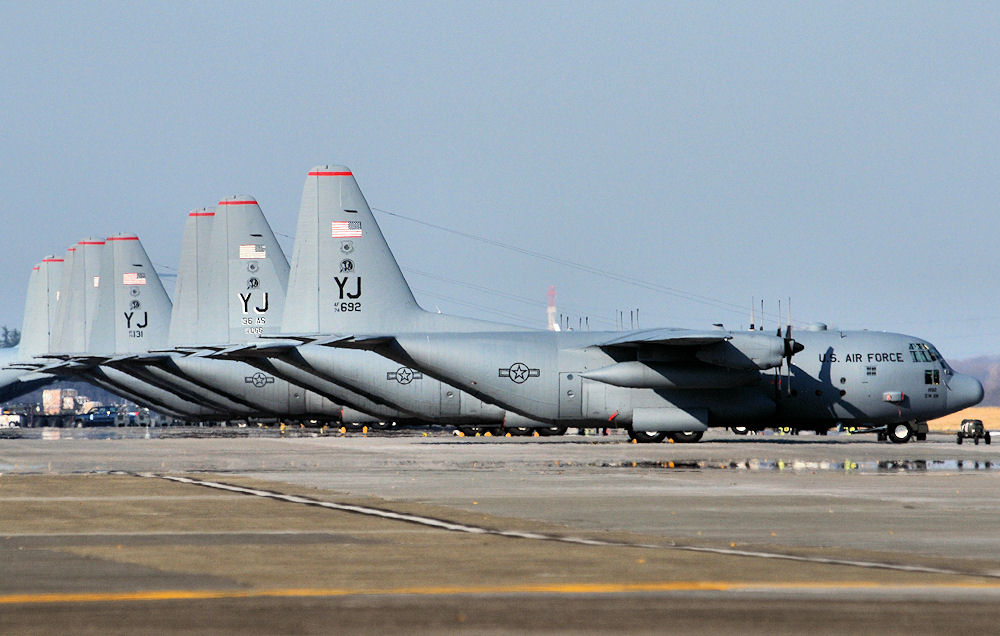
C-130 Hercules aircraft of the 36th Airlift Squadron wait on the flightline

The 374th Operations Group (374 OG) is the operational flying component of the United States Air Force 374th Airlift Wing. It is stationed at Yokota Air Base, Japan.

The unit's World War II predecessor unit, the 374th Troop Carrier Group operated primarily in the Southwest Pacific Theater, being formed in Australia in 1942 using resources from the Air Carrier Service (formerly Air Transport Command). The group employed a large variety of aircraft to perform air transport of troops, cargo, and evacuation of the wounded, earning two United States Distinguished Unit Citations (DUCs) in Papua New Guinea. In January–February 1943, the group supplied Allied forces during the battle of Wau airstrip, making landings at the airstrip under enemy fire and earning its third DUC. When the Korean War broke out in June 1950, was the only air transport group in the Far East. During the Cold War, the group airlifted wounded French troops from Indo-China to Japan, en route to France. Inactivated in 1958, the group was reactivated in 1966 at Naha AB, Okinawa as part of 315th Air Division and was active in the Vietnam War. Since that time its assigned squadrons have conducted special operations, aeromedical evacuations, search and rescue operations, humanitarian relief and theater airlift missions in support of US and United Nations security interests throughout the Far East.

The group has never been assigned to the United States.

== Overview ==
The 374 OG maintains a forward presence by providing rapid responsive movement of personnel, equipment and operational support in the Asia-Pacific region. Ensures the combat readiness of three operational squadrons using C-130J, C-12J and UH-1N aircraft. Conducts three distinct missions; intratheater airlift, aeromedical evacuation and distinguished visitor transport for U.S. Pacific Command and other agencies in support of national security policy.

The unit consists of the following squadrons:

- 36th Airlift Squadron C-130J (Tail Code: YJ)

Only forward-based tactical airlift squadron in the Pacific. Maintains a forward presence and supports combat operations by providing responsive movement of personnel and equipment through aerial delivery and assault airland operations. Maintains C-130J mission-ready aircrew to conduct theater airlift, special operations, aeromedical evacuation, search and rescue, repatriation and humanitarian relief missions.

- 319th Expeditionary Reconnaissance Squadron MQ-9
- 459th Airlift Squadron C-12J

Maintains a forward presence in the Pacific and provides responsive airlift support for distinguished visitors, as well as other priority passengers and cargo, on travel vital to the national security interest of the United States. Maintains both UH-1N and C-12J mission-ready aircrews to conduct aeromedical evacuation, search and rescue and priority airlift missions throughout the Pacific.

- 374th Operations Support Squadron

Maintains a forward presence in the Western Pacific, supporting U.S. Pacific Command interests. Provides for flight operations, intelligence, combat survival, aviation resource management, aircrew training, life support, weather forecasting and observing, combat tactics, mission scheduling, airfield management and air traffic control. Supports the group staff and two airlift squadrons operating UH-1N, C-12J and C-130H aircraft.

== History ==
For additional lineage and history, see 374th Airlift Wing

The 374th Troop Carrier Group drew its resources from the Air Carrier Service (formerly Air Transport Command) Allied Air Forces, Southwest Pacific Area when it formed in November 1942. It had four troop carrier squadrons assigned, the 21st and 22d were veterans of the South Pacific Area. During the remainder of 1942 and early 1943, the group employed a large variety of aircraft to perform air transport of troops, cargo, and evacuation of the wounded, earning two Distinguished Unit Citations (DUCs) in Papua. In January–February 1943, the group supplied Allied forces during the battle of Wau airstrip, making landings at the airstrip under enemy fire and earning its third DUC. From mid-Feb to July 1943, the group transported personnel and supplies to three principal areas: Dobodura, where a large base was being constructed; Wau and Bulolo, rear bases for advancing Allied forces; and to patrols skirting Lae and Salamau.

During Jul and August 1943, the group trained elements of the 375th, 403d, and 433d Troop Carrier Groups. When the campaign against Lae opened on 5 September 1943, the 374th led aircraft of those groups in a drop of US airborne troops and Australian artillery paratroops at Nadzab airdrome. The next day, as vegetation around the captured airdrome still burned, the group landed engineer troops and equipment to repair the damaged runways, and artillery to protect the captured airstrip. After the capture of Lae ten days later, the group flew 303 trips moving large stores of ammo, supplies, and equipment for use of advancing ground troops. From October 1943 – May 1944, the 374th maintained an unending flow of troops and equipment, including arms and ammunition, to units scattered throughout Australia and New Guinea areas. It continued to provide these services and in November 1944 commenced cargo and personnel flights to Leyte in the Philippines, which required three days for a round trip. By January 1945, flights in the New Guinea and Australian areas continued, but flights to the Philippines almost ceased until the group moved to Nielson Field near Manila and remained until the end of the war.

The group participated in training maneuvers with army and naval forces in the Pacific Theater until May 1946. From October 1946 – April 1947, it provided troop carrier and air courier services and participated in joint maneuvers in the Pacific.

It moved to Japan in March 1949 and when the Korean War broke out in June 1950, was the only air transport group in the Far East. For its work between 27 June and 15 September 1950, transporting vital cargo, personnel and evacuating wounded men, the 374th earned its fourth DUC. In April 1953, the group transported the first of several groups of repatriated prisoners of war from Korea to Japan.

Beginning in January 1954, the 374th airlifted wounded French troops from Indo-China to Japan, en route to France. Principal operations from 1955 until 1958 consisted of numerous mobility exercises, routine theater airlift, and occasional exercises throughout the Western Pacific region.

Activated as an Operations Group under the objective wing structure in April 1992, the group gained control over the 374th Airlift Wing's operational squadrons. From 1992 to present, the 374th Operation Group's assigned squadrons conducted special operations, aeromedical evacuations, search and rescue operations, humanitarian relief and theater airlift missions in support of US and UN security interests throughout the Far East.

== Lineage ==
- Established as the 374th Troop Carrier Group on 7 November 1942

Activated on 12 November 1942
Inactivated on 15 May 1946

- Activated on 15 October 1946

Redesignated 374th Troop Carrier Group, Heavy on 21 May 1948
Inactivated on 18 November 1958

- Redesignated: 374th Tactical Airlift Group on 31 July 1985 (Remained inactive)
- Redesignated: 374th Operations Group on 1 April 1992

Activated on 1 April 1992

=== Assignments ===
- V Air Force Service Command, 12 November 1942

Attached to: Directorate of Air Transport, Allied Air Forces, Southwest Pacific Area [DAT, AAFSWPA], 12 November–December 1942
Attached to: Advance Echelon, Fifth Air Force, December 1942-25 May 1943

- 54th Troop Carrier Wing, 26 May 1943
- Fifth Air Force, 28 September 1943

Attached to: DAT, AAFSWPA, 28 September 1943-c. 31 August 1944

- Far East Air Forces (Provisional), 15 June 1944

Attached to: 54th Troop Carrier Wing, c. 1 September 1944–

- 5298th Troop Carrier Wing (Provisional), 3 October 1944

Remained attached to: 54th Troop Carrier Wing

- 322d Troop Carrier Wing, 30 December 1944

Remained attached to 54th Troop Carrier Wing to c. 5 January 1945

- 54th Troop Carrier Wing, 26 January – 15 May 1946
- United States Army Forces, Pacific, 15 October 1946

Attached to Pacific Air Service Command, United States Army, 15 October – 14 December 1946

- Pacific Air Service Command, United States Army (later, Far East Air Material Command), 15 December 1946

Attached to: Philippine Air Material Area [Provisional], 1 February 1947–

- Thirteenth Air Force, 20 February 1947

Remained attached to Philippine Air Material Area [Provisional] to 24 March 1947

- Philippine Air Material Area, (Provisional), 25 March 1947
- Twentieth Air Force, 1 April 1947
- Marianas Air Material Area (Provisional), 1 September 1947

Attached to: Twentieth Air Force, 1 September 1947 – 16 August 1948

- 374th Troop Carrier Wing, 17 August 1948
- 1503 Air Transport Wing, 1 July 1957 – 18 November 1958
- 374th Airlift Wing, 1 April 1992–present

=== Components ===
- 4th Troop Carrier Squadron: attached 2–17 December 1950, 25 July – 16 November 1951
- 6th Troop Carrier Squadron: 12 November 1942 – 15 May 1946 (detached 2 July-c. 1 September 1944); 15 October 1946 – 18 November 1958 (detached 1 February – 30 November 1947, 3 February 1956 – 1 July 1957, 8 July – 18 November 1958)
- 9th Troop Carrier Squadron: c. February-15 May 1946
- 14th Troop Carrier Squadron: attached 16 November 1951 – 31 March 1952, 15–30 November 1952
- 19th Troop Carrier (later, 19 Airlift) Squadron: 15 October – 31 December 1946; 1 June 1992 – 1 October 1993
- 20th Aeromedical Airlift: 1 October 1992 – 1 October 1993
- 21st Troop Carrier (later, 21 Airlift) Squadron: 12 November 1942 – 31 May 1946 (detached 2 July-c. 1 September 1944); 15 October 1946 – 18 September 1956 (detached 1 February – 31 August 1947, 5 March 1949 – 18 May 1950, 22 July 1950 – 25 January 1951, 29 June 1951 – 30 November 1952, 3 February 1956 – 18 September 1956); 1 April 1992 – 1 October 1993
- 22d Troop Carrier Squadron: 12 November 1942 – 31 January 1946 (detached 2 July-c. 1 September 1944); 15 October 1946 – 18 November 1958 (detached 1 February 1947 – 4 March 1949, 3 February 1956 – 1 July 1957; not operational 10 June 1957 – 18 November 1958)
- 30th Airlift Squadron: 1 October 1993 – 1 September 2003
- 33d Troop Carrier Squadron: 12 November 1942 – 15 February 1946
- 35th Troop Carrier Squadron : 1963–1971
- 36th Airlift Squadron: 1 October 1993–present
- 41st Troop Carrier Squadron : 1965–1971
- 46th Troop Carrier Squadron: attached 5 March – 1 April 1949
- 344th Troop Carrier Squadron: attached 15 December 1952 – 13 October 1953
- 345th Airlift Squadron: 1 April 1992 – 1 July 1993
- 459th Airlift Squadron: 1 October 1993–present
- 817th Troop Carrier Squadron : 1960–71

=== Stations ===
- Archerfield Airport, Brisbane, Australia, 12 November 1942
- Port Moresby Airfield Complex, New Guinea, December 1942
- RAAF Base Townsville, Townsville, Australia, 7 October 1943
- Nadzab Airfield Complex, New Guinea, c. 1 September 1944
- Mokmer Airfield, Biak, Netherlands East Indies, c. 14 October 1944
- Nielson Field, Luzon, Philippines, 28 May 1945 – 15 May 1946
- Nichols Field, Luzon, Philippines, 15 October 1946
- Harmon Field (later, AFB), Guam, 1 April 1947
- Tachikawa AFB (later, AB), Japan, 5 March 1949 – 18 November 1958

Deployed at Ashiya AB, Japan, c. 15 September – 17 December 1950

- Naha AB, Okinawa: August 1966-May 1971
- Ching Chang Kuan AB, Taiwan: May 1971–1973
- Clark AB, PI: 1973–1992
- Yokota AB, Japan, 1 April 1992–present

=== Aircraft ===
- B-17 1942–1943; VB-17, 1951
- C-39, 1942–1943
- C-47, 1942–1946; 1947–1953
- C-49, 1942–1943
- C-50, 1942–1943
- C-53, 1942–1943
- C-56, 1942
- C-59, 1942
- C-60, 1942–1943
- DC-2, 1942
- DC-3, 1942
- DC-5, 1942
- LB-30, 1942–1943
- C-46, 1945–1947, 1949, 1952–1953
- C-54, 1946–1947, 1947–1956
- C-119, 1951
- C-124, 1952–1956, 1957–1958
- C-130A, C130B, 1966–1971
- C-9, 1992
- C-12, 1992
- C-21, 1992–present
- C-130, 1992–present
- UH-1N, 1992–present
