= 1503rd Air Transport Wing =

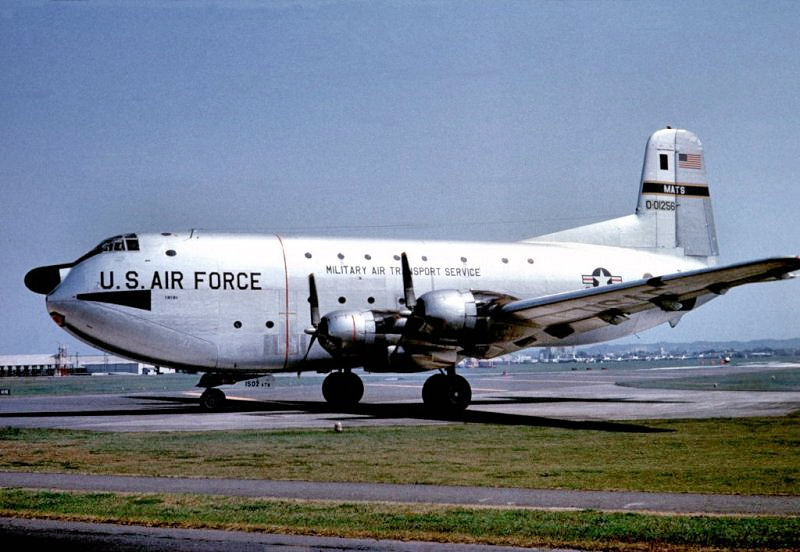
- MATS C-124A Globemaster II 50-1256
- Active: 1948–1964
- Country: United States
- Branch: United States Air Force
- Type: Airlift

Insignia
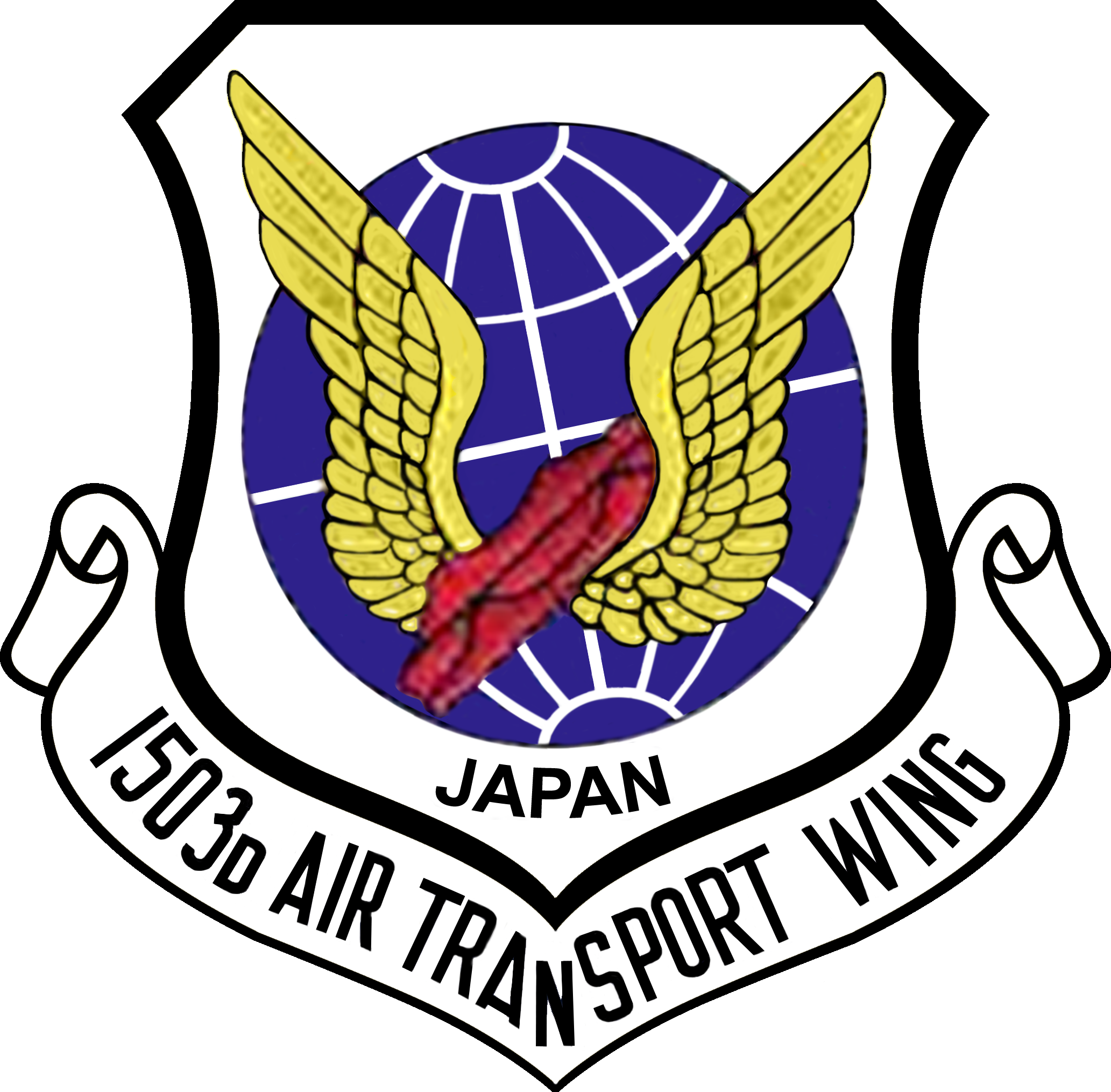
- 1503rd Air Transport Wing emblem

The 1503rd Air Transport Wing is an inactive United States Air Force unit. It was last assigned to Western Transport Air Force of Military Air Transport Service at Tachikawa Air Base, Japan. It was inactivated on 22 June 1964 and its remaining squadron transferred to the 1503rd Air Transport Group.

== History ==
The wing was first organized in at Haneda Air Base in June 1948 as the 540th Air Transport Wing by Military Air Transport Service (MATS). Along with its subordinate units, it replaced the 22nd Air Transport Group (Provisional) and absorbed the personnel and equipment of the 1539th Air Force Base Unit of Air Transport Command, which had been stationed at Haneda since the summer of 1946. The wing was soon renamed the 1503rd Air Transport Wing to comply with United States Air Force requirements that MATS units be numbered between 1200 and 2199.

The 1503rd became the main MATS organization in the Western Pacific, supporting numerous tenant organizations such as the Air Rescue Service; Air Weather Service, and Far East Air Force theater Troop Carrier Groups (later Wings) which transshipped supplies and personnel from the MATS Aerial Port at Tachikawa throughout the 1950s.

The first major mission by the 1503rd was the evacuation of large numbers of Americans out of China in 1948 after the Communists defeated the Chinese Nationalist forces during the Chinese Civil War.

The Korean War saw operations increase, with Troop Carrier units carrying out the evacuation of American civilians and then transporting the torrent of Allied military men and material flowing into the war zone. Around the clock planes arrived and departed. A typical flight might carry 35,000 pounds of hand grenades to South Korea, with 80 wounded personnel arriving to be transported to the USAF Hospital on the base. For thousands of servicemen whose tours took them into, through or out of Tachikawa, the USAF hospital became the best barometer of American military activities in the Far East.

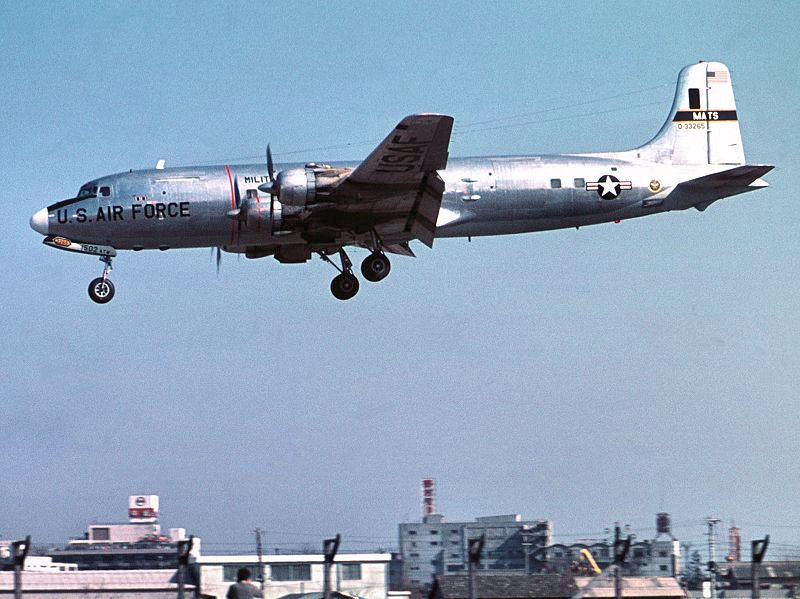
MATS C-118A Liftmaster 53-3265

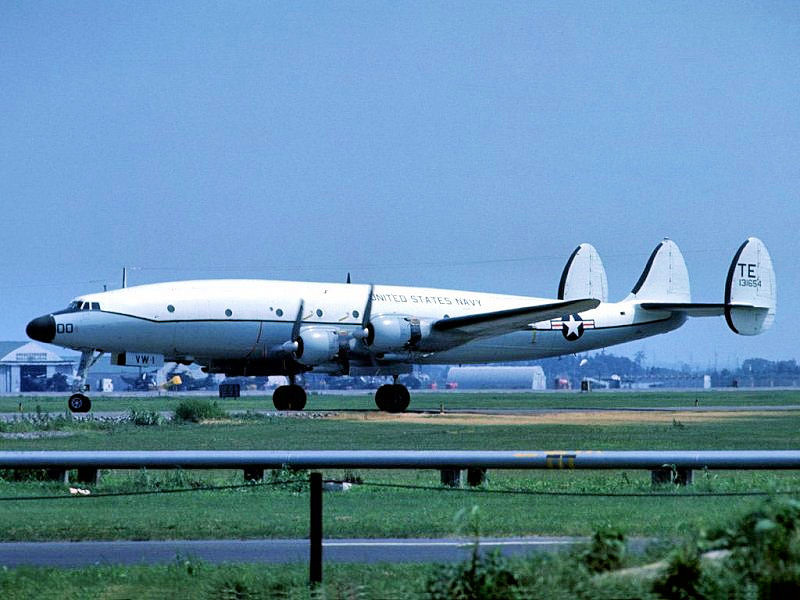
MATS Navy R7V-B1 Bn 131654

MATS flights arriving on C-74, C-118, C-121, C-124, and later C-135 jet transports from Hickam Field, Hawaii or being staged through Alaska. From Tachikawa, outbound MATS flights headed to Clark Air Base heading to Saigon, Bangkok, and on to Karachi Airport, Pakistan or to Guam, Wake or Midway Island in the Central Pacific Region.

As United States military forces began to increase in Indochina, more and more equipment moved into first Tan Son Nhut Air Base in South Vietnam, then to Don Muang Royal Thai Air Force Base, near Bangkok, and in early 1965 to the huge new Cam Ranh Air Base with the jet C-141 Starlifter transports.

In 1964, operations from Tachikawa began to phase down as its location in the urban area of Tokyo made heavy transport operations undesirable, with more and more heavy transport operations going to Yokota Air Base. The 1503rd was discontinued and replaced by the 1503rd Air Transport Group, and focused more on aeromedical transport operations from the Philippines, and supporting MATS units at deployed locations in the Pacific.

== Lineage ==
- Designated as the 540th Air Transport Wing and organized on 1 June 1948

Redesignated 1503rd Air Transport Wing on 1 October 1948
Redesignated 1503rd Air Transport Wing, Medium on 1 January 1956
Redesignated 1503rd Air Transport Wing, Heavy on 1 July 1957
Discontinued on 22 June 1964

=== Assignments ===
- Pacific Division, Military Air Transport Service, 1 June 1948
- Western Transport Air Force, Military Air Transport Service, 1 July 1958 – 22 June 1964

=== Components ===
Groups

- 540th Air Base Group (later 1503rd Air Base Group), 1 June 1948 – 15 July 1957
- 540th Maintenance & Supply Group (later 1503rd Maintenance & Supply Group), 1 June 1948 – 1 October 1955
- 1503rd Maintenance Group, 1 April 1958 – 30 June 1958

Operational Squadrons

- 6th Troop Carrier Squadron, 18 November 1958 – 22 June 1964
- 22nd Troop Carrier Squadron, 18 November 1958 – 22 June 1964
- 100th Air Transport Squadron, 20 July 1952 – 1 October 1955
- 1273rd Air Transport Squadron, 1 October 1948 – 11 July 1949 (attached to 1422nd Air Transport Group (Provisional) for Berlin Airlift)

Support and Maintenance Squadrons

- 540th Medical Service Squadron (later 1503rd Medical Group, 1503rd USAF Infirmary), 1 June 1948 – 1 October 1955
- 1503rd Base Flight Squadron (later 1503rd Flight Line Maintenance Squadron, 1 October 1955 – 1 April 1958, 30 June 1958 – 22 June 1964
- 1503rd Field Maintenance Squadron, 1 October 1955 – 1 April 1958, 30 June 1958 – 22 June 1964
- 1503rd Periodic Maintenance Squadron (later 1503rd Organizational Maintenance Squadron, 30 June 1958 – 22 June 1964
- 1503rd Air Support Squadron (later 1503rd Support Squadron, 1504th Air Terminal Squadron, 1504th Support Squadron), 1 July 1950 – 1 July 1959

Agana Naval Air Station, Guam

- 1505th Support Squadron, 1 April 1958 – 22 June 1965

Kadena Air Base, Okinawa

- 1506th Support Squadron, 1 April 1958 – 22 June 1965

Clark Air Base, Philippines

=== Stations ===
- Haneda Air Base, Japan, 1 June 1948
- Tachikawa Air Base, Japan, 15 July 1957 – 22 June 1964
