= Port Moresby Airfield Complex =

Military airfield complex in Port Moresby, Papua New Guinea

Port Moresby Airfield Complex
- Port Moresby in New Guinea
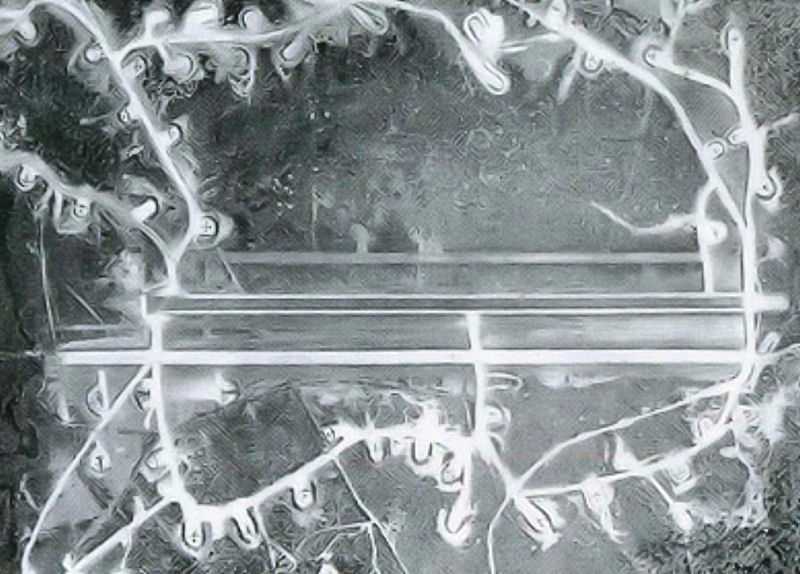
- Jackson Airfield (7 Mile Drome). Primary airfield in the Port Moresby Airfield Complex, 1943

Site information
- Operator: USAAF Fifth Air Force; Royal Australian Air Force

Location
- Location of Port Moresby Airfield Complex (Jackson Field)
- Coordinates: 09°26′36″S 147°13′12″E

Site history
- Built: 1942
- In use: 1942-1945
- Battles/wars: Battle of New Guinea

The Port Moresby Airfield Complex was a World War II military airfield complex, built near Port Moresby in the Territory of Papua and New Guinea. It was used during the Battle of New Guinea as a base of Allied air operations primarily in 1942 and early 1943. It later became a support base as the battle moved to the north and western part of New Guinea. It was closed and the facility turned over to civil authorities after the end of the War in September 1945.

This complex of airfields is historically significant as it was from these airfields that the Royal Australian Air Force and the United States Army Air Forces supported Allied ground forces in the Battle of New Guinea. It represented the changing fortunes of war in the Pacific and the end of the Japanese expansion in the Southwestern Pacific during World War II.

== History ==
The pre–World War II Port Moresby Airport became one of the primary airfields (Jackson Airfield) used by the Allied forces during the New Guinea campaign (1942–1945), and was part of a multiple-airfield complex in the Port Moresby area.

When American forces arrived in April 1942, the airfield was further developed and expanded. Revetments were constructed to protect parked aircraft and defenses. With the end of the war, the USAAF withdrew from the complex in 1945; however, it was used as a major disposal point for excess Allied aircraft, and for years disposed B-17s, P-47s, B-25s, P-38s, A-20Gs, and even a few P-40s could be found in various states of decay in the area. Some were refurbished and inducted into museums around the world

== Airfields ==
=== Kila Kila Airfield (3 Mile Drome) ===
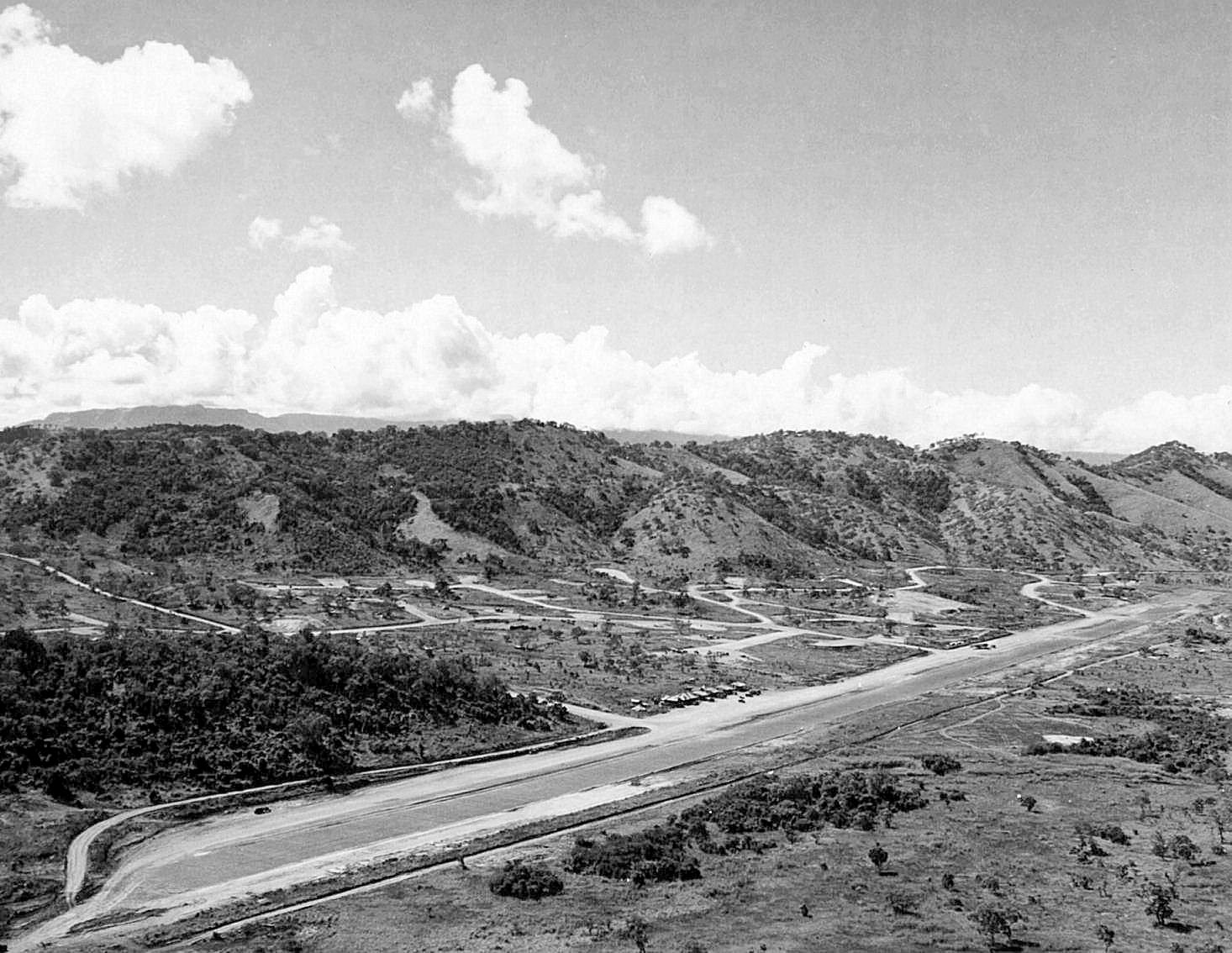
Kila Kila Airfield (3 Mile Drome)

Located: 1.8 miles (2.9 km) South of Port Moresby 09°29′24.92″S 147°11′31.19″E

The Kila Airfield was built by the Australians in 1933, and during the 1930s it was Port Moresby's first airport. Taken over by the RAAF in January 1942, it was expanded for use by military fighters, light bombers and transports. Its runway was a gravel bed overlaid with Pierced Steel Planking 5,000×100 ft. It includes dispersal pads, taxiways and several buildings.

USAAF assigned units:

8th Bombardment Squadron, 31 March – 9 May 1942 (A-24, A-20)
89th Bombardment Squadron, 1 September 1942 – 9 May 1943 (A-20)
8th Fighter Squadron, 25 September 1942 – 15 April 1943 (P-40)
35th Fighter Squadron, 10 May – 25 December 1943 (P-40)
67th Fighter Squadron, 30 May – 28 June 1943 (P-39)
80th Fighter Squadron, 20 July – 8 November 1942; 21 March – 11 December 1943 (P-39)

By 1944, the airfield was relegated to a support field and was returned to civil use after the war. Today, Kila Kila Airfield is now part of Port Moresby suburban area. It contains the Kila Police Barracks and a technical school. Its wartime past is mostly obliterated by modern development.

=== Jackson Airfield (7 Mile Drome) ===
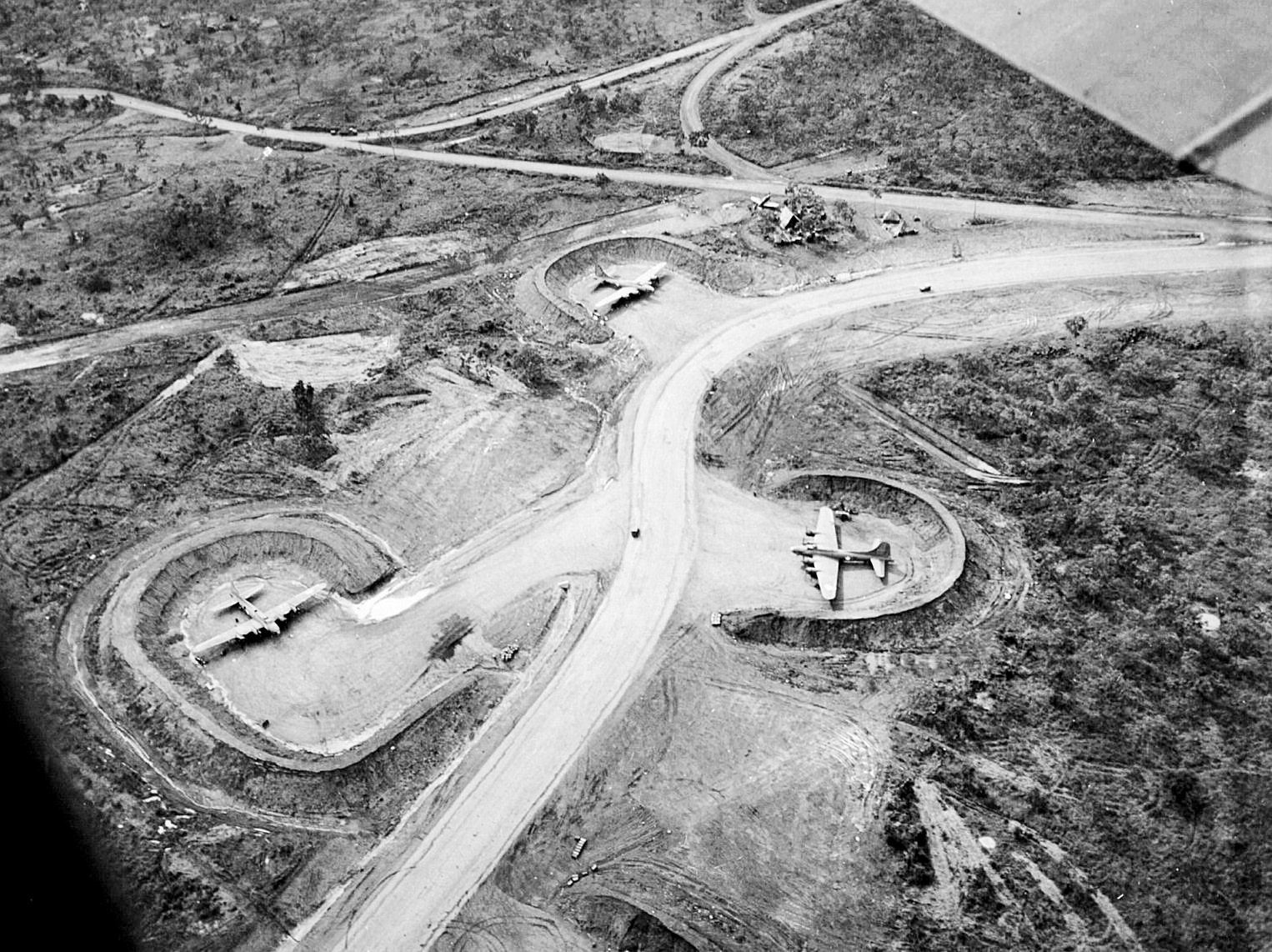
Jackson Airfield (7 Mile Drome), close up of revetments. Note B-17 Flying Fortress bombers parked in them

Located: 2.4 miles (3.9 km) Northeast of Port Moresby 09°26′36″S 147°13′12″E

Named in honor of Squadron Leader John Francis Jackson, D.F.C. 75 Squadron Royal Australian Air Force, aged 34. Killed in action while flying P-40E A29-8 on 28 April 1942.

Jackson Airfield was one of the primary airfields at Port Moresby at the start of the Japanese invasion of the island, and one of their principal targets. It based the first fighters that flew in defense of Port Moresby, RAAF 75 Squadron from March–May 1942. It was originally a pre-war airstrip with two parallel runways. American B-17 Flying Fortresses used the airfield en route to Clark Field on 9 September 1941. During the war, it was further expanded and improved by the Australians and Americans.

When American forces arrived in April 1942, the airfield was further developed. Eventually there were three parallel runways, running roughly north-west to south-east. In the middle was the original runway, a fighter strip 3,000×100 ft surfaced with Pierced Steel Planking (PSP). To the north-east side was a bomber strip 3,000' x 150' surfaced with PSP later expanded to 3,750 ft. On the south-west side was a crash strip 7,500×100 ft. Revetments were constructed to protect parked aircraft and defenses. A network of taxiways between Jackson and Wards Airfields made it possible to taxi between the two airfields.

Assigned units:

No. 75 Squadron RAAF, 19 March - 7 May 1942 (P-40)
35th Pursuit Squadron, 26 April - 15 May 1942 (P-39)
36th Pursuit Squadron, 28 April - July 1942 (P-39)
HQ, 43d Bombardment Group, 14 September 1942 – 10 December 1943
8th Bombardment Squadron, 28 January – 10 April 1943 (A-24, B-25)
63d Bombardment Squadron, 23 January – 29 October 1943 (B-17)
64th Bombardment Squadron, 20 January – 10 December 1943 (B-17)
65th Bombardment Squadron, 20 January-11 December 1943 (B-17)
403d Bombardment Squadron, 11 May – 13 December 1943 (B-24)
HQ 348th Fighter Group, 23 June – 16 December 1943
340th Fighter Squadron, 23 June – 17 December 1943 (P-47)

Today, the airfield is Papua New Guinea's international airport, and the air hub for all Air Niugini flights in and out of the nation. Also, a number of smaller regional airlines and helicopter and aviation services. At the western end of the airport are several large revetments for B-17 and B-24 bombers, still in excellent condition.

=== Wards Airfield (5 Mile Drome) ===
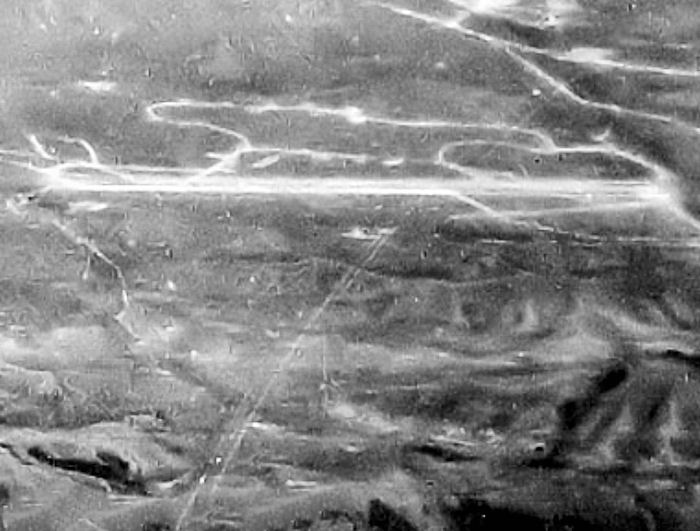
Wards Airfield (5 Mile Drome)

Located: 2.5 miles (4.0 km) north-northwest of Port Moresby 09°25′49″S 147°10′55″E

Named in honor of Australian Lt. Col. K. H. Ward, who was involved with its construction and was killed on August 27, 1942, during the fighting at Isurava on the Kokoda Trail.

Constructed primarily by Australian engineers in 1942, with American engineers grading and surfacing the runway. Consisted of two parallel 6,000' x 100' runways, with an extensive taxiway and revetment area; a taxiway connected to Jackson Airfield (7 Mile Drome). During 1943, Wards was the busiest airfield in the entire Southern Hemisphere. It was used by transport and heavy bomber and fighter aircraft.

Assigned units:

Operations Headquarters, Fifth Air Force
Headquarters, 374th Troop Carrier Group. 1 December 1942 – 7 October 1943
22d Troop Carrier Squadron, 24 January – 4 October 1943 (C-47)
320th Bombardment Squadron, 10 February 1943 – 23 February 1944 (B-24)
321st Bombardment Squadron, 10 February – 1 December 1943 (B-24)
341st Fighter Squadron, 23 June – 13 December 1943 (P-47)
342d Fighter Squadron, 23 June – 16 December 1943 (P-47)

No. 22 Squadron RAAF, (A-20)
No. 30 Squadron RAAF, (Bristol Beaufighter)

The 27th Air Depot, Air Force Technical Service Command, was located to the southeast of the airfield. The group was responsible for assembling crated aircraft delivered by ship docked in Fairfax Harbor from the United States. Brand new aircraft were delivered to Port Moresby assembled and then flown to other bases. Ships continued to dock at Port Moresby until mid-1945 when transports switched to Manila Bay.

Today, Wards Airfield is now part of Port Moresby suburban area. The main runway of the airfield appears to be used as Kumuni Avenue, in the Waigani area of Port Moresby, where most of the government buildings and embassies are located. The revetments and most of the wartime facilities, however, are now part of history. Located on a hill behind Wards Drome. A large 5th Air Force insignia and USAAF star, drawn into the concrete. Concrete steps, a garden and path that went up the ridge towards the HQ. In the 1980s traces of the paint still remained. Today, both the 5th AF logo and USSAF are partially broken, and the area is overgrown, but it still offers commanding views and an impressive remnant of the American era at Wards Airfield.

=== Berry Airfield (12 Mile Drome) ===
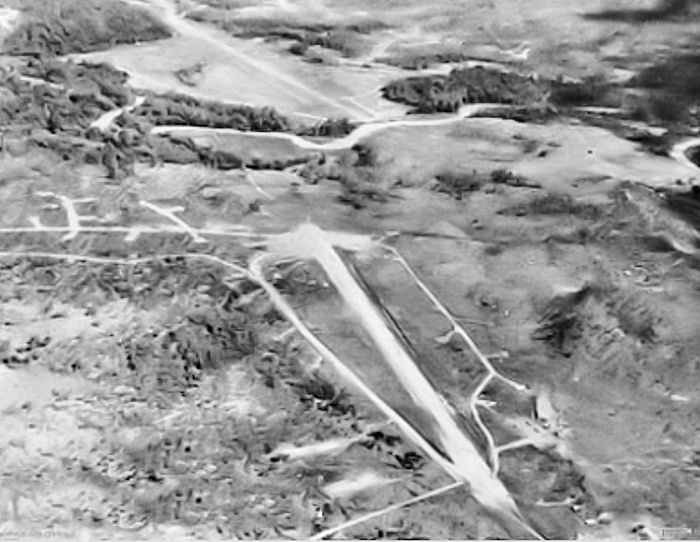
Berry Airfield (12 Mile Drome)

Located: 6.4 miles (10.3 km) Northeast of Port Moresby 09°23′19.78″S 147°14′42.82″E

Officially named Berry Airfield in honor of P-39D 41-7165 pilot Major Jack W. Berry on November 10, 1942.

The airfield was constructed in early 1942, being completed on 15 May. The airfield had an 8-inch base of crushed rock and pit gravel for a single earth runway approximately 4,500' by 150'. It also had 40 dispersal bays, and 4 alert areas that would accommodate 15 fighter aircraft.

Assigned units:

35th Pursuit Squadron, 15 May - June 1942 (P-39)
40th Fighter Squadron, 2 June – 30 July 1942 (P-39)
80th Fighter Squadron, 20 July – 8 November 1942; 21 March – 11 December 1943 (P-39)
No. 75 Squadron RAAF, (P-40)

Today the former main runway has been converted to a road which goes to Port Moresby. The Bomana Police Training College is located at the site of the former strip, and the Bomana War Cemetery is at the far end of the strip. All in all, the former airfield site is obliterated by the march of time and development in the area.

=== Schwimmer Airfield (14 Mile Drome) ===
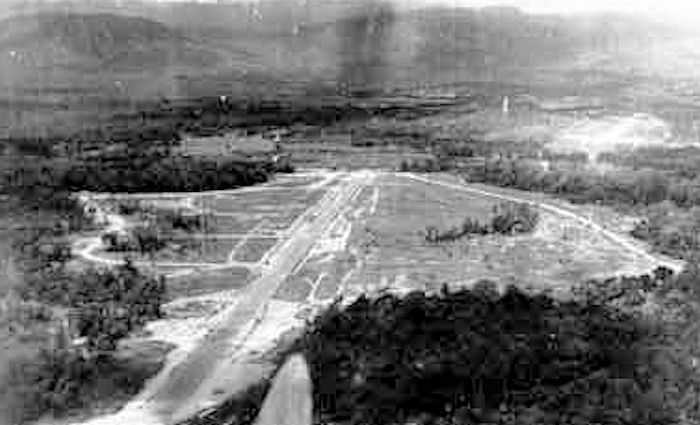
Schwimmer Airfield (14 Mile Drome)

Located: 6.9 miles (11.1 km) North-northeast of Port Moresby 09°22′25.56″S 147°13′56.82″E

Named in honor of Charles Schwimmer on 10 November 1942, lost in P-39D 41-6956 intercepting Japanese aircraft over Port Moresby.

Built in 1942 and surfaced with PSP. No revetments were built at the airfield, but taxiway and parking areas dispersed to the north of the runway in a semi-circle. Living quarters were pyramid tents a half mile from the strip in scrub trees.

Assigned units:

13th Bombardment Squadron (Flight), 16 December 1942 – 22 May 1943 (B-25)
7th Fighter Squadron (Flight), 19 September 1942 – 15 April 1943 (P-40)
9th Fighter Squadron, 10 October 1942 – 6 March 1943 (P-40)
39th Fighter Squadron, 18 October 1942 – 15 December 1943 (P-38, P-39)
HQ, 6th Photographic Group, 10 December 1943 – 17 February 1944
8th Reconnaissance Squadron, 9 September 1942 – 16 March 1944

The airfield was abandoned after the war, and today no evidence remains that this was a military airfield, being obliterated by the passage of time and human redevelopment of the site.

=== Durand Airfield (17 Mile Drome) ===
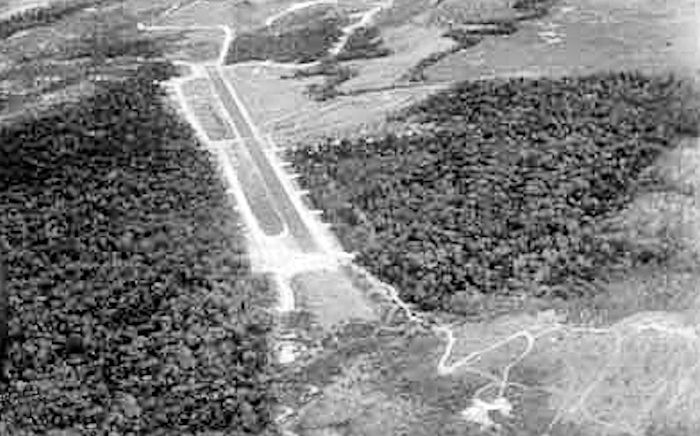
Durand Airfield (17 Mile Drome)

Located: 5.8 miles (9.3 km) North-Northwest of Port Moresby 09°22′57.35″S 147°10′23.76″E

Named in honor of P-39 pilot Edward D. Durand missing in action on April 30, 1942,

Opened in early 1942, was used as a frontline airfield for fighters and medium bombers during all of 1943. Consisted of a single main runway, running roughly NW-SE was constructed by the 808th Airborne Engineers, and completed in August 1942. The runway was separate from the dispersal and camp areas, where revetments were carved into hillsides and taxiways elevated for drainage. Gun pits built of 55 gallon drums for anti-aircraft were built on the surrounding hills, and buildings on concrete slabs, or tents on gravel from the nearby quarry.

Assigned units:

13th Bombardment Squadron (Flight), 16 December 1942 – 22 May 1943 (B-25)
90th Bombardment Squadron, 28 January – 21 May 1943 1943 (B-25)
71st Bombardment Squadron, 26 November 1942 – 4 March 1944 (B-25)
405th Bombardment Squadron, 6 November 1942 – 4 March 1944 (B-25)
499th Bombardment Squadron, 5 June 1943 – 15 January 1944 (B-25)
500th Bombardment Squadron, 5 June 1943 – 1 January 1944 (B-25)
7th Fighter Squadron (Flight), 19 September 1942 – 15 April 1943 (P-40)

Abandoned after the war ended, vegetation has returned to the area once cleared off for an airfield. Presumably elements of the facility remain under the vegetation canopy as an outline of the main runway can be discerned.

=== Rogers Airfield (30 Mile Drome) ===
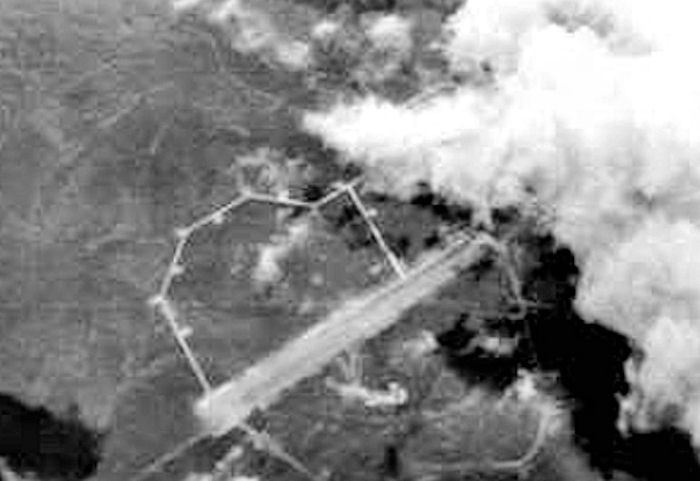
Rogers Airfield (30 Mile Drome)

Located: 35.5 miles (57.1 km) northwest of Port Moresby 09°02′37.12″S 146°53′40.32″E

Named in honor of Major Floyd "Buck" W. Rogers (C. O. of 3rd Bombardment Group, 8th BS Bombardment Squadron) who was KIA piloting A-24 41–15797.

The airfield was built by the US Army, construction was initiated during the middle of 1942. On May 4, 1942, US Army 43rd Engineering Regiment, Company E moves to this location begin construction. Originally, the single runway was to be surfaced with marston matting, but the matting bound for this airfield was instead retained for use in Port Moresby. Without matting, this airstrip was not capable of handling heavy bombers. The first usage of the completed runway was during the first week of June, 1942. When built, it was described as a secret airfield. This runway with matting remained for many years as the second runway, being little used, for light aircraft. The remaining matting was torn up in late 1972 and a new 9000 foot reinforced runway (now 14R) with ILS was completed in 1973, before Independence Day. 14L (6000 feet) was the main runway from 1945 to 1972, and has since been much shortened. The matting has been a familiar sight around Port Moresby since the 1950s, being used as fencing and retaining walls.

Probably, one of the first landings at the airfield when a damaged P-39 Airacobra piloted by Paul G. Brown on 17 May 1942. Later, the Airacobra was repaired and flew back to base. The airfield was used to base fighters from July 1942 until the end of August 1943. Afterwards, the airfield continued to be used as a crash strip.

Assigned units:

7th Fighter Squadron (Flight), 19 September 1942 – 15 April 1943 (P-40)
40th Fighter Squadron, 25 November 1942 – 11 August 1943 (P-39, P-400)
41st Fighter Squadron, 20 July 1942 – 16 August 1943 (P-39, P-400)

The airfield was apparently used as a private airport until the 1970s, then abandoned. Today, the outline of the main runway can be seen in aerial imagery; the entire area has returned to a natural vegetation cover, being overgrown with kunai grass.

=== Fishermans Airfield ===
Located: 10.2 miles (16.4 km) West-Southwest of Port Moresby 09°30′47.64″S 147°03′02.06″E

Built by the RAAF c. 1944 as an emergency airfield on Daugo Island. Abandoned since the end of World War II, today the remains of the runway can be seen in aerial images.

== See also ==
- United States Army Air Forces in the South West Pacific Theatre
- Naval Base Port Moresby
