= Nielson Field =

Former military and civilian airfield in Makati, Philippines

Nielson Field
- Part of Fifth Air Force
- Makati, Philippines
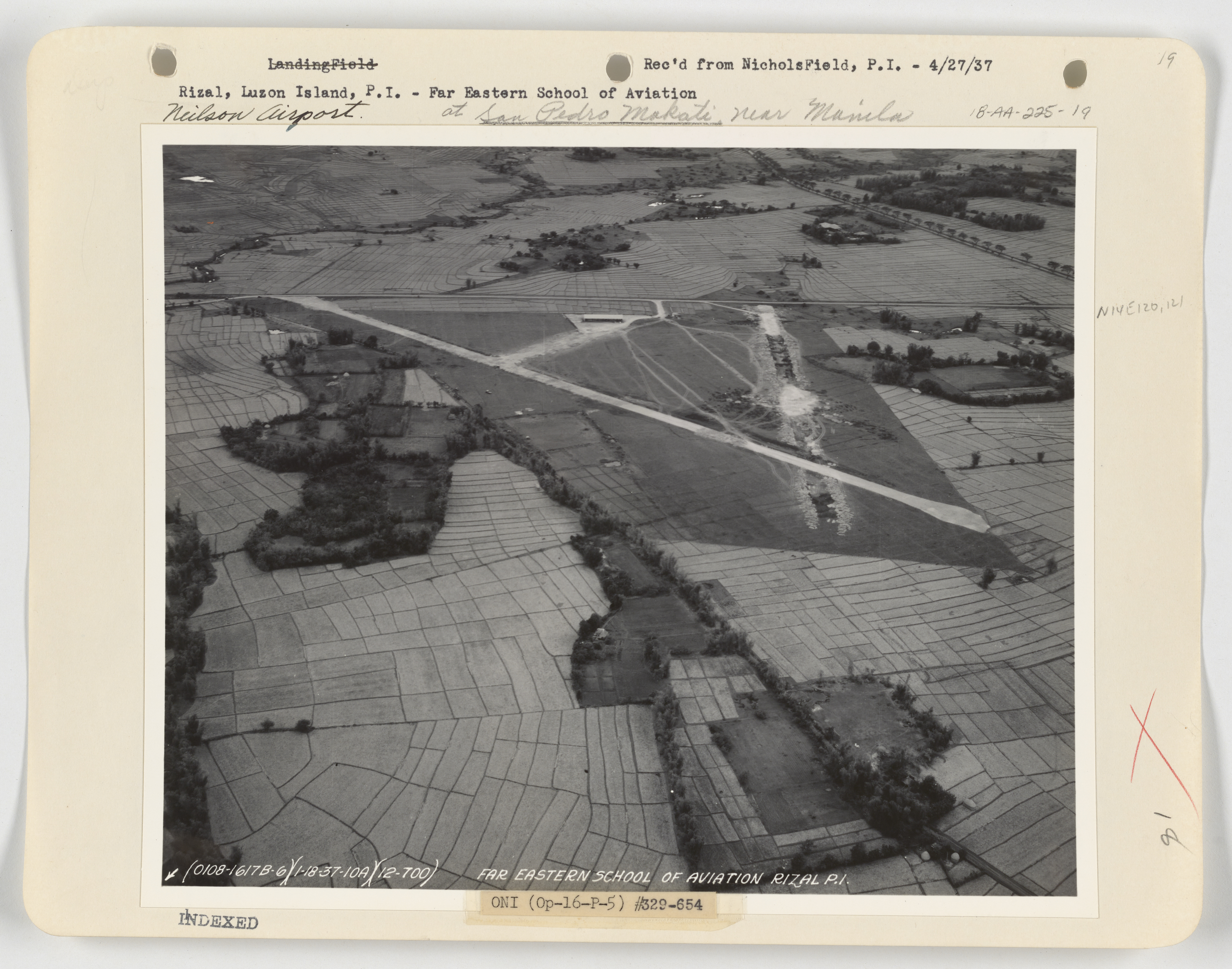
- Aerial view of Nielson Airport in 1937

Site information
- Type: Military airfield
- Controlled by: United States Army Air Forces

Location
- Nielson Field, Philippines
- Coordinates: 14°33′02.06″N 121°01′46.08″E

Site history
- Built: 1937
- In use: 1937–1948

Nielson Field (Luzon, the Philippines) was the location of the Far East Air Force headquarters of the United States Army in the Philippines. Most of the aircraft of the FEAF were based at either Clark Field or Nichols Field. The cultural site was an Honourable Mention in the 2001 UNESCO Asia Pacific Heritage Awards.

== Laurie Reuben Nielson ==
Laurie Reuben Nielson was one of the many foreigners attracted by the business opportunities in the Philippines and moved to the country before World War II. Born in New Zealand, Nielson and his American wife, Annette, arrived in Manila in the early-to-mid-1930s. He established himself in local business, setting up his own firm, L. R. Nielson & Company, and making inroads in the securities and stock brokerage business, importing, and mining. Nielson also sat on the board of The Hongkong and Shanghai Banking Corporation branch in Manila.

Nielson was an avid aviation enthusiast; with this, he became involved in a project to build an aviation school and airport in Manila. It was an ideal time for pursuing the project because there was a real need for an airport to support the increased economic activity in the country, especially in the mining industry, at the same time, the Quezon government was encouraging infrastructure projects. Nielson convinced several other Manila-based foreign investors to join him in the project and construction of the airport proceeded after the group leased 42 hectares (100 acres) of land in Makati from Ayala y Compañía. When it was inaugurated in July 1937, the Nielson Airport was being touted as the biggest and best-equipped in Asia.

After the outbreak of the war and the invasion of Manila by Japanese forces in 1942, Nielson and his family were detained by the Japanese authorities. Nielson's wife and two sons were brought to the internment camp at the University of Santo Tomas. Nielson, because he was British, was taken for internment in British Hong Kong (present-day Hong Kong). Nielson was never seen or heard from again.

By the time the Philippines was liberated from the Japanese, Nielson's businesses and most of his properties were all gone. After his wife and two sons left the Philippines and returned to the United States for good, Nielson's only remaining legacy to the Philippines was the airport he had built.

== Nielson Airport ==
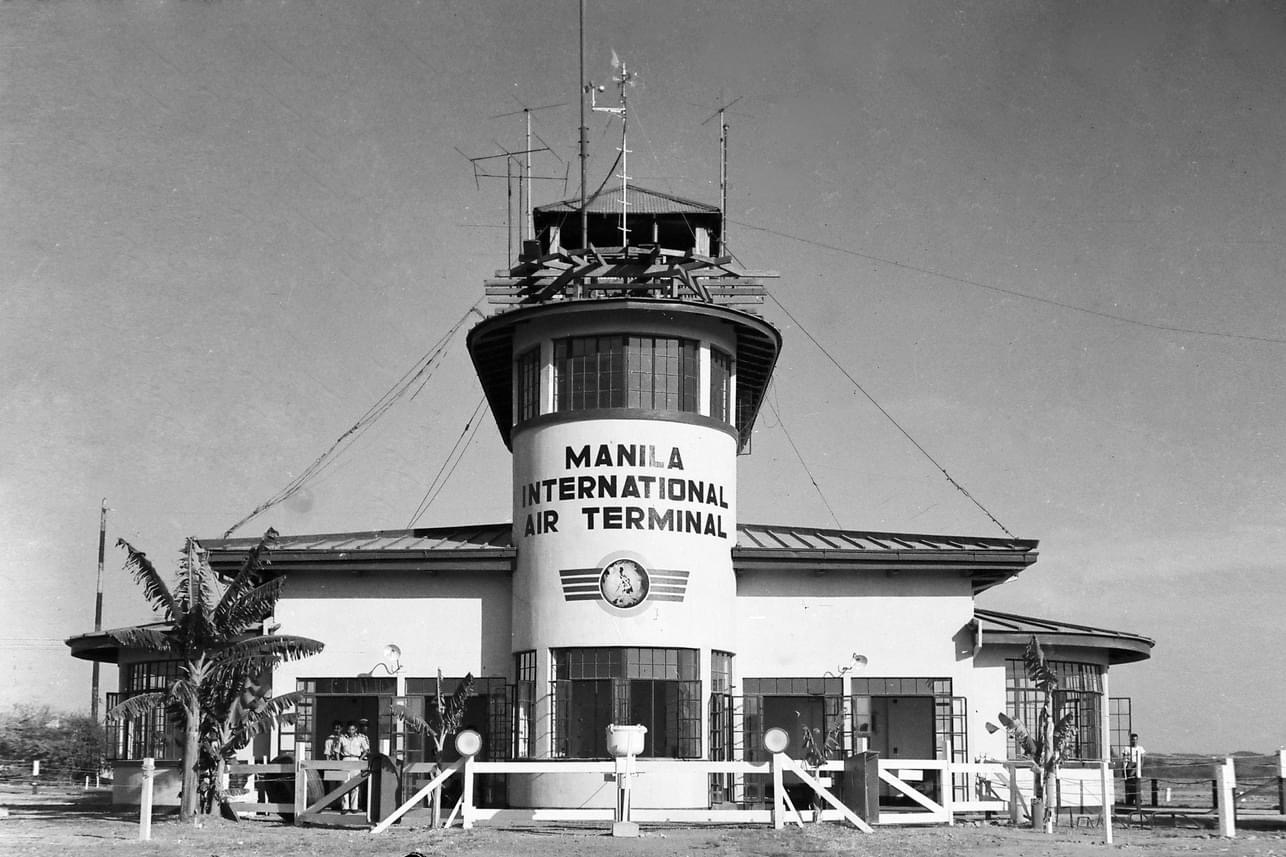
Nielson Tower

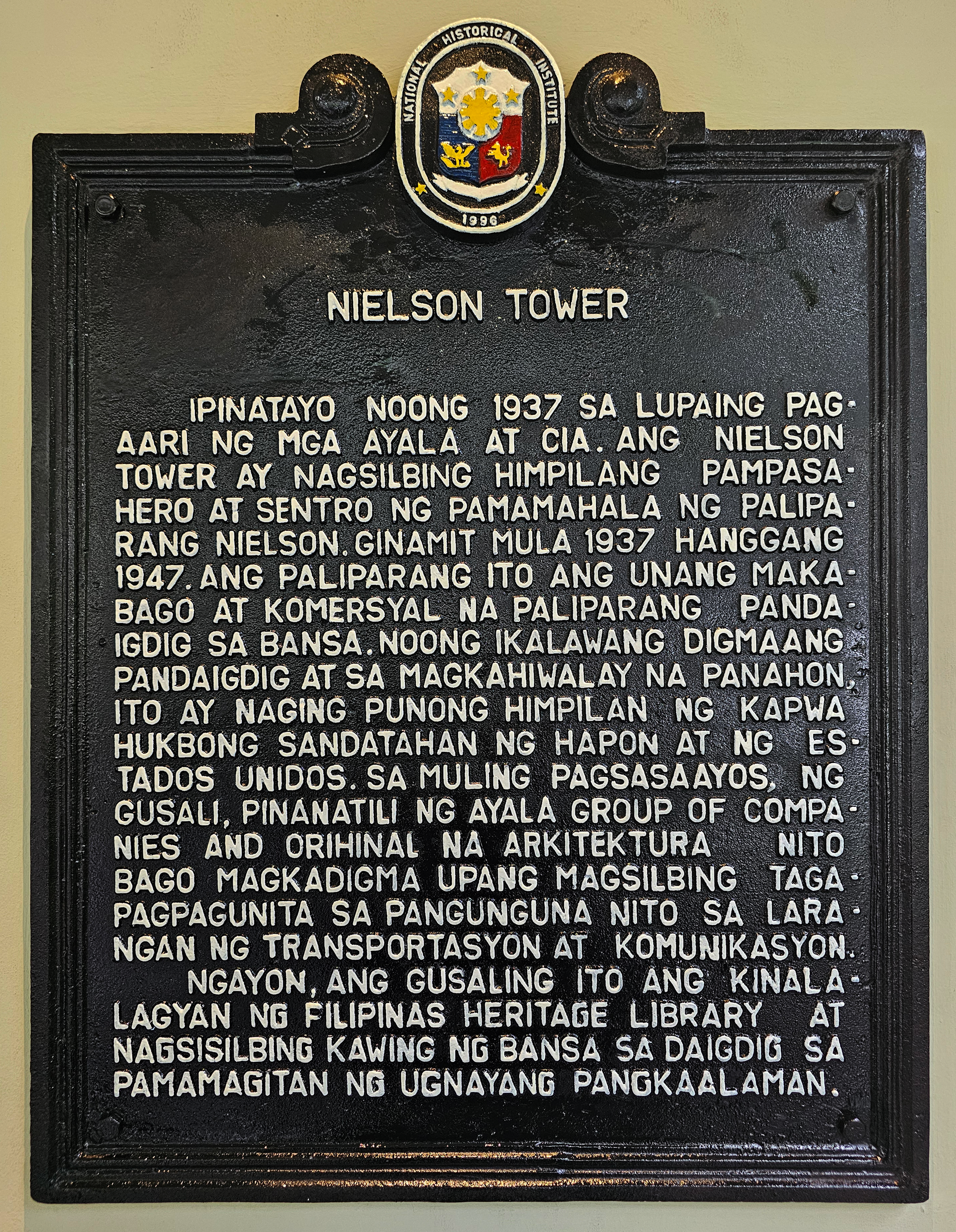
The plaque at the entrance to Nielson Tower

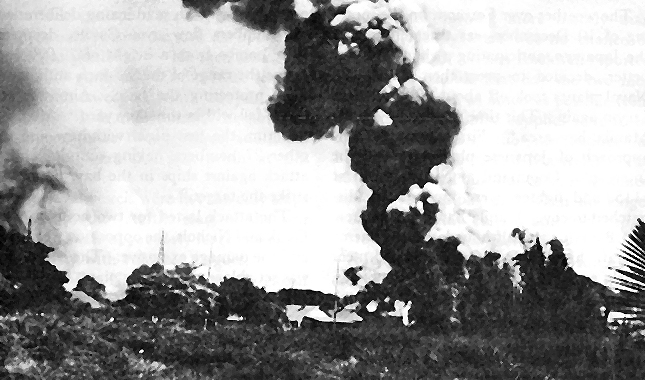
Nielson Field in flames after a Japanese attack on December 10, 1941

The property on which the airport stood was part of the Hacienda San Pedro de Macati owned by the Zóbel de Ayala family, then in the province of Rizal. The hacienda encompassed most of what is now the city of Makati. When Enrique Zóbel de Ayala, then senior managing partner at Ayala y Compañía (present-day Ayala Corporation) and a special aide to President Manuel L. Quezon, found out about the Nielson group's proposal to the government to build an airport on a turnkey basis, he immediately offered a portion of the hacienda as a possible site for the facility. It was an ideal location for the airport because Makati was then just a sparsely populated town adjacent to Manila. The site was located on a hard tract of land jutting from rice fields, clearly visible from the air, allowing clear approaches from all sides.

The Nielson Airport became the base of the American Far Eastern School of Aviation. More importantly, with the introduction of commercial air services at the airport, it became the primary gateway between Manila and the rest of the country and, later, between the Philippines and the world. The Philippine Aerial Taxi Company (PATCO), the first airline company in the Philippines, and the Iloilo-Negros Air Express Company, the first Filipino-owned commercial passenger airline, started operating from the Nielson Airport. By 1940 it was international airport because it was a regular destination of Dutch airliners. When Philippine Air Lines was established, its very first flight took off in March 1941 from the Nielson Airport for Baguio.

As a response to the expansionist policy of Japan, authorities in the Philippines set up the Far East Air Force (FEAF) headquarters at the Nielson Airport. Commercial flights at the airport were halted in October 1941 and the private carriers were asked to relocate their services to make room for the U.S. Army Air Forces.

When Japanese planes attacked the Philippines on December 8, 1941, the planes were actually spotted by a radar station in Northern Luzon, which immediately alerted the FEAF headquarters at Nielson. Unfortunately, by the time FEAF officers were finally able to get through to Clark Air Base in Pampanga, it was already too late and Japanese bombs were already dropping on Clark. By December 9 Nielson Airport was also under siege. The Americans and Filipinos retreated to Bataan, and on January 2 troops of the Japanese Sixteenth Division advancing through Pateros invaded Makati. The objective of the Japanese was Fort Wm. McKinley, and Nielson Field was also captured. They were respectively renamed Cherry Blossom Barracks and East Air Port. They also modernized the runways by enlarging and improving them. Originally, the black-topped runways were NE/SW 2,850ft x 99ft and NW/SE 2,850ft x 99ft each on a grassy strip 199ft wide, which the Japanese enlarged to 3,960ft x 328ft. NW/SE and 50 percent of the NE/SW runway were paved with concrete. Other notable improvements included a wide taxiway which encircled the field, revetments, and barracks for 600 men. This airport served as a depot for Japanese planes staging south and it was once reported to have had as many as 300 aircraft at one time. All types of aircraft used the runways and the daily aircraft average was given as ninety. The unit based at East Air Port was the Fifty-first Air Brigade of the Imperial Japanese Army Air Force equipped with Ki-49 bombers. On the morning of September 21, 1944, this airport and three other Japanese air bases in Greater Manila were attacked by American carrier aircraft. This caused President Laurel to issue declarations of martial law and of war. On February 12, 1945, during the Battle of Greater Manila, the American Fifth Cavalry Regiment advanced southward from the vicinity of Poblacion and gained control of the airport. The American army's Philippine Civil Affairs Unit later established a supply depot at the airport, and three American transport squadrons equipped with C-47s were assigned to the airport. The partially damaged airport, which was renamed Makati Airport, and its facilities were fully restored and commercial air services, including international flights, resumed in 1946. It also became the headquarters of the newly formed Philippine Air Force.

In 1948, when the airport ceased operations in Makati to relocate to its present site adjacent to Nichols Field (now Villamor Air Base) in Pasay, ownership of the airport's permanent facilities reverted to the owner of the land, Ayala y Compañía. Although the runways were eventually converted into roads – the secondary runway (runway 07/25) became Paseo de Roxas and the primary runway (runway 12/30) became Ayala Avenue – and other airport structures were sacrificed to give way to the development of the Makati business and commercial district, the owners preserved the airport's passenger terminal and control tower, which came to be known as the Nielson Tower.

== Nielson Tower ==
In the succeeding years, various uses were found for the Nielson Tower, a two-story concrete structure designed to resemble an airplane from a bird's-eye view. At one point, it served as the headquarters of a police detachment. It also housed the offices of the Ayala-owned Integrated Property Management Corporation for several years.

From the late 1970s up to April 1994, a group of Filipino investors leased the tower for a semi-private, first-class club and restaurant, as it is opposite The Peninsula Manila hotel. In 1996, after almost two years of renovation work, the Nielson Tower became the home of the Filipinas Heritage Library before its transfer to the Ayala Museum. In 2014, Nielson Tower became the home of an upscale restaurant and bar called Blackbird, which uses the former controlroom as its upper dining floor.

== Former airlines and destinations ==
| Airlines | Destinations |
|---|---|
| Philippine Air Lines | Calcutta, Karachi, London–Croydon, Madrid, Rome, Tagbilaran |
| Northwest Airlines | Tokyo |

== See also ==
- Geography of the Philippines
- Military History of the Philippines
- Military History of the United States
- USAAF in the Southwest Pacific
