= 322nd Airlift Division =

322d Airlift Division
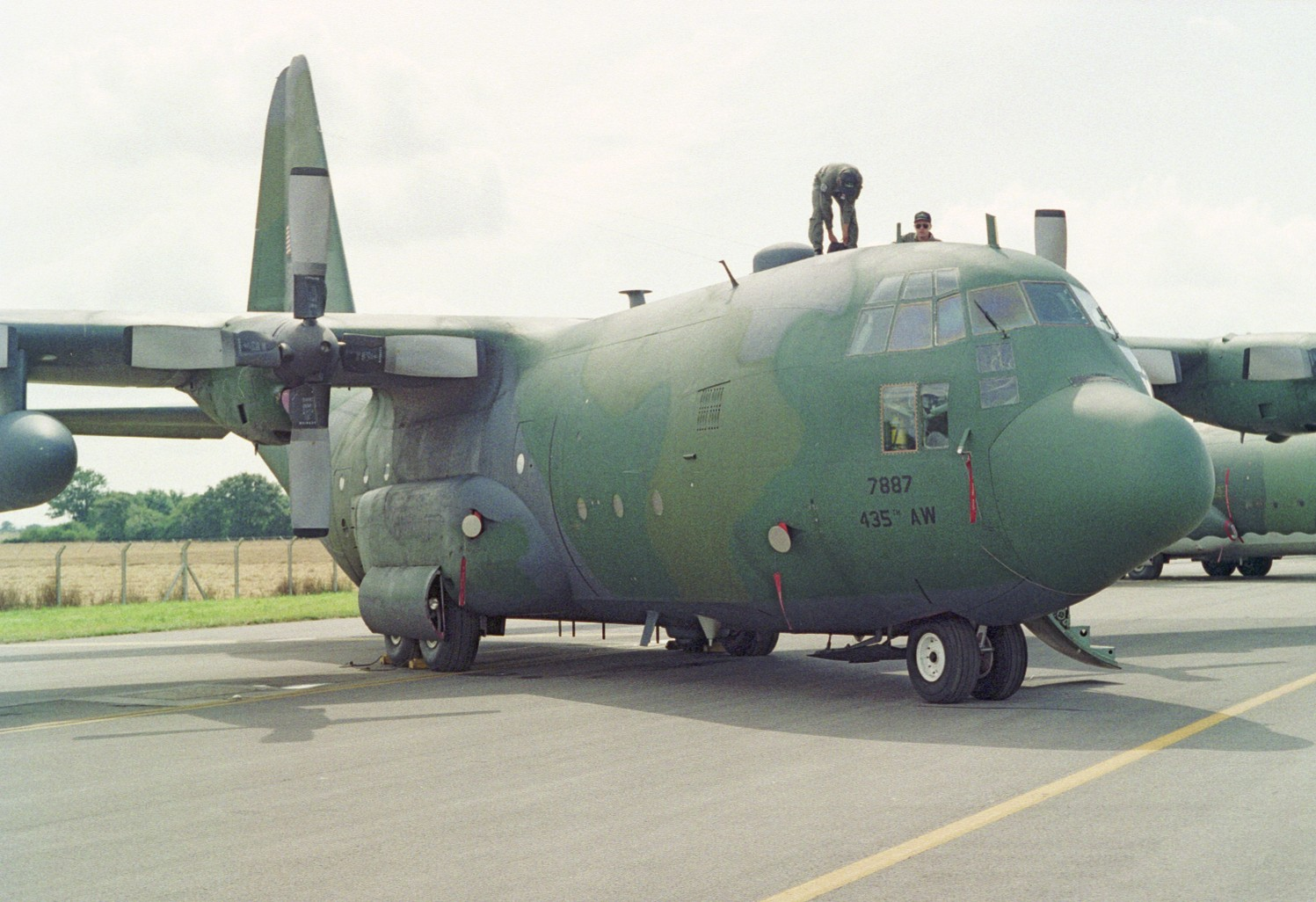
- C-130E Hercules of the 435th Wing (Note: Aircraft is Lockheed C-130E-LM Hercules, serial 63-7887. Transferred to the Aerospace Maintenance and Regeneration Center on 8 January 2007. Baugher, Joe (25 July 2023). "1963 USAF Serial Numbers". Joe Baugher.)
- Active: 1944–1946; 1947–1949; 1954–1968; 1978–1992
- Country: United States
- Branch: United States Air Force
- Role: Command of airlift forces
- Engagements: Southwest Pacific Theater
- Decorations: Air Force Outstanding Unit Award

Insignia
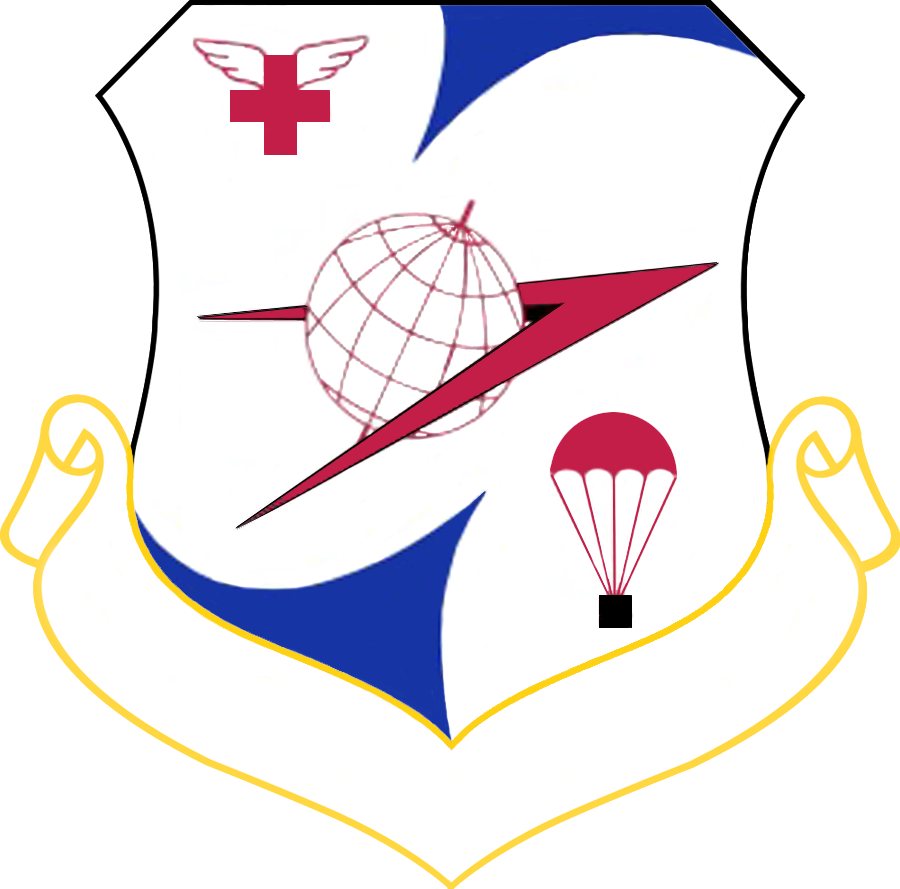
- 322d Airlift Division emblem (Note: Approved 16 Aug 1956. Description: On a shield argent between the points of a flying dart gules, a sphere of the field['s color], with axis, latitude lines, longitude lines and outline sable; in dexter chief a cross couped of the second [colot mentioned], winged of the first [color mentioned]; in sinister base a parachute gules, lines and detail black; two points pointed bendwise, one in dexter base and one in sinister chief azure.)

The 322d Airlift Division is an inactive United States Air Force organization. Its last assignment was with Military Airlift Command, assigned to Twenty-First Air Force, being stationed at Ramstein Air Base, Germany, where it was inactivated on 1 April 1992.

== History ==
During World War II, the 322d Troop Carrier Wing primarily carried high priority cargo destined for Air Corps organizations in the Southwest Pacific Area (SWPA). Besides carrying passengers and cargo, it evacuated wounded personnel and flew courier routes in SWPA.

Active in the reserve from June 1947 to June 1949, it supervised subordinate unit training.

From March 1954, the 322d Air Division was responsible for airlifting personnel, cargo, and mail in Europe. Almost immediately after it commenced operations in Europe, the 322d became involved in a major airlift of French troops (Project Bali Hai) from bases in France to Indochina. Initially concerned only with operations in West Germany and France, it soon began operating throughout the entire United States Air Forces in Europe (USAFE) area of responsibility. In addition to its routine duties, the division supported numerous humanitarian missions to Turkey, Iran, Morocco, and Pakistan, among other states.

It also provided airlift support in the following crises: the nationalization of the Suez Canal in 1956; the Hungarian Revolution of 1956; the 1958 Lebanon crisis; support for UN forces in the Congo in 1960–1961; the invasion of India by Communist Chinese forces in 1962–1963; airlift of peacekeeping forces to Cyprus in 1964; and the Middle East crisis of 1967.

Between 1954 and 1968, the division supported numerous USAFE and NATO exercises.

From June 1978, the 322d managed tactical airlift forces stationed and operating in the European theater and coordinated strategic airlift from the United States and other origins. It also assumed responsibility for all aeromedical operations and administrative airlift in the theater, including highly positioned military and civilian U.S. and foreign government officials. In addition, the division supported military exercises such as Ardent Ground, Dawn Patrol, Flintlock, and Cold Fire/Reforger.

In 1985 the 322d acquired peacetime responsibility for airlift management in Africa.

== Lineage ==
- Established as the 322d Troop Carrier Wing on 4 December 1944

Activated on 30 December 1944
Inactivated on 15 February 1946

- Activated in the reserve on 12 June 1947

Redesignated 322d Air Division, Troop Carrier on 16 April 1948.
Inactivated on 27 June 1949

- Redesignated 322d Air Division (Combat Cargo) and activated on 1 March 1954

Redesignated 322d Air Division on 8 January 1966
Inactivated on 24 December 1968

- Redesignated 322d Airlift Division on 13 June 1978

Activated on 23 June 1978
Inactivated on 1 April 1992

=== Assignments ===
- Far East Air Forces, 30 December 1944
- Far East Air Service Command, 3 January 1945 – 15 February 1946
- Second Air Force, 12 June 1947
- Tenth Air Force, 1 July 1948 – 27 June 1949
- United States Air Forces in Europe, 1 March 1954
- Eastern Transport Air Force (later Twenty-First Air Force), 1 April 1964 – 24 December 1968
- Twenty-First Air Force, 23 June 1978 – 1 April 1992

=== Stations ===
- Hollandia, New Guinea, 30 December 1944
- Manila, Luzon, Philippines, 22 July 1945 – 15 February 1946
- Lowry Field (later Lowry Air Force Base), Colorado, 12 June 1947 – 27 June 1949
- Wiesbaden Air Base, Germany, 1 March 1954
- Ramstein Air Base, Germany, 22 March 1954 – 12 August 1955
- Évreux-Fauville Air Base, France, 12 August 1955 – 1 April 1964
- Châteauroux-Déols Air Base, France, 1 April 1964 – 5 August 1966
- RAF High Wycombe, England, 5 August 1966 – 24 December 1968
- Ramstein Air Base, Germany, 23 June 1978 – 1 April 1992

=== Operational components ===
==== Wings ====
- Air Transport Wing, Provisional (Europe): attached 18 July-27 August 1960
- 60th Troop Carrier Wing: Attached 1 April 1954 – 31 July 1955, assigned 1 August 1955 – 25 September 1958
- 317th Troop Carrier Wing: Attached 1 April 1954 – 31 July 1955; 1 April – 20 June 1964; assigned 1 August 1955 – 25 September 1958; 15 April 1963 – 1 April 1964
- 435th Tactical Airlift Wing: 23 June 1978 – 1 April 1992
- 465th Troop Carrier Wing: Attached 1 April 1954 – 31 July 1955, assigned 1 August 1955 – 8 July 1957
- 513th Troop Carrier Wing (later 513 Tactical Airlift Wing): Attached 15 April 1966 – 24 December 1968

==== Groups ====
- 309th Troop Carrier Group: 2 June-8 August 1956 (detached entire period)
- 313th Tactical Airlift Group: 15 September 1978 – 1 April 1992
- 374th Troop Carrier Group: 30 December 1944 – 26 January 1946 (detached until 3 January 1945)
- 403d Troop Carrier Group: 1–26 January 1946
- 435th Tactical Airlift Group: 23 June-15 September 1978
- 439th Military Airlift Support Group: 8 January 1966 – 24 December 1968
- 440th Troop Carrier Group: 3 September 1947 – 27 June 1949
- 608th Military Airlift Group: 1 August 1983 – 1 April 1992
- 1602d Air Transport Group: 1 July 1964 – 8 January 1966

==== Squadrons ====
- Air Transport Squadron Provisional, 1: attached 1 Dec 1962-10 Sep 1963
- Air Transport Squadron Provisional (Europe 1): attached 27 Aug-1 Sep 1945
- 1st Air Transport Squadron: attached c. 11 Aug-Sep 1945
- 1st Troop Carrier Squadron: attached c. 23 Sep 1945-c. Jan 1946 (Philippine Army)
- Air Transport Squadron Provisional (Europe 2): attached 27 Aug 1960-21 Sep 1961
- Air Transport Squadron Provisional (Europe 3): attached 27 Aug-12 Oct 1960
- 3d Troop Carrier Squadron: attached 5 Feb-1 Sep 1958
- Air Transport Squadron Provisional (Europe 4): attached 27 Aug-1 Sep 1960
- 5th Troop Carrier Squadron: 12 Sep 1947-1 Jul 1948; 28 Mar-c. 25 Feb 1958
- 8th Combat Cargo Squadron: attached 30 Dec 1944-3 Jan 1945
- 9th Troop Carrier Squadron: attached c. 1 Aug 1957-c. 25 Feb 1958
- 10th Troop Carrier Squadron (later 10th Military Airlift Squadron): 25 Jun 1950 - Jun 1953; 25 Sep 1958 - 8 Jan 1961; 1 Jan - 15 Mar 1984
- 11th Troop Carrier Squadron: 25 Sep 1958-8 Jan 1961
- 12th Troop Carrier Squadron: 25 Sep 1958-8 Jan 1961
- 14th Troop Carrier Squadron: attached c. 19 Aug 1959-c. 15 Feb 1960
- 15th Troop Carrier Squadron: attached 7 Feb-c. 28 Aug 1957; Jul-21 Aug 1960
- 22d Troop Carrier Squadron: attached 30 Dec 1944-3 Jan 1945
- 23d Helicopter Squadron: 1 Nov 1956-8 Jan 1958
- 31st Air Transport Squadron: attached 13 Aug-16 Sep 1958
- 33d Troop Carrier Squadron: attached 30 Dec 1944-3 Jan 1945
- 39th Troop Carrier Squadron: 25 Sep 1958-15 Apr 1963
- 40th Troop Carrier Squadron: 25 Sep 1958-15 Apr 1963
- 41st Troop Carrier Squadron: 25 Sep 1958-15 Apr 1963
- 52d Troop Carrier Squadron (later 52 Military Airlift Squadron): attached 29 Jan-Aug 1960; c. Mar 1962-24 Dec 1968
- 53d Troop Carrier Squadron: attached c. 29 Aug 1958-Feb 1959; 5 Jan 1961-c. Mar 1962
- 54th Troop Carrier Squadron: attached Feb 1959-c. 19 Aug 1959
- 58th Military Airlift Squadron: 23 Jun 1978-1 Aug 1983
- 62d Troop Carrier Squadron: attached 28 Oct 1955-24 Apr 1956
- 773d Troop Carrier Squadron: attached 15 Nov 1954-19 May 1955
- 776th Troop Carrier Squadron: attached 15 Nov 1954-19 May 1955
- 778th Troop Carrier Squadron: attached 26 Apr-4 Nov 1955
- 7167th Special Air Missions Squadron (later 7167th Air Transport Squadron): attached 1 Apr 1954-31 Jul 1955, assigned 1 Aug 1955-15 Jul 1962
- 7206th Air Transport Squadron (later 7168th Air Transport Squadron): attached 15 May-30 Sep 1955; 1 Oct 1955-24 May 1956; assigned 25 May 1956-1 Nov 1957 (detached 1 Mar-1 Nov 1957)
- 7317th Operations Squadron: 25 Sep-10 Nov 1958 (detached entire period)

==== Other ====
- Military Airlift Center, Europe: 23 June 1978 – 15 January 1981
- Airlift Task Force, Provisional: attached 18–29 May 1958

=== Aircraft ===
- Curtiss C-46 Commando, 1944–1946, 1947–1949
- Douglas C-47 Skytrain, 1944–1946
- North American T-6 Texan, 1947–1949
- Beechcraft T-7 Navigator, 1947–1949
- Beechcraft T-11 Kansan, 1947–1949
- Fairchild C-119 Flying Boxcar, 1954–1958
- Fairchild C-123 Provider, 1956–1958
- Douglas C-124 Globemaster II, 1957–1968
- Lockheed C-130 Hercules, 1957–1968
- Douglas C-9 Nightingale, 1978–c. 1992
- Beechcraft C-12 Huron, 1978–c. 1992
- North American T-39 Sabreliner, 1978–1984
- Boeing C-135 Stratolifter, 1978–c. 1992
- Lockheed C-140 Jetstar, 1982–c. 1992
- Short C-23 Sherpa, 1984–c. 1992
- Gulfstream C-20, 1987–c. 1992
- Learjet C-21, 1987–c. 1992
- Bell UH-1 Iroquois, 1987–c. 1992

== See also ==
- List of United States Air Force air divisions
