= 370th Air Expeditionary Wing =

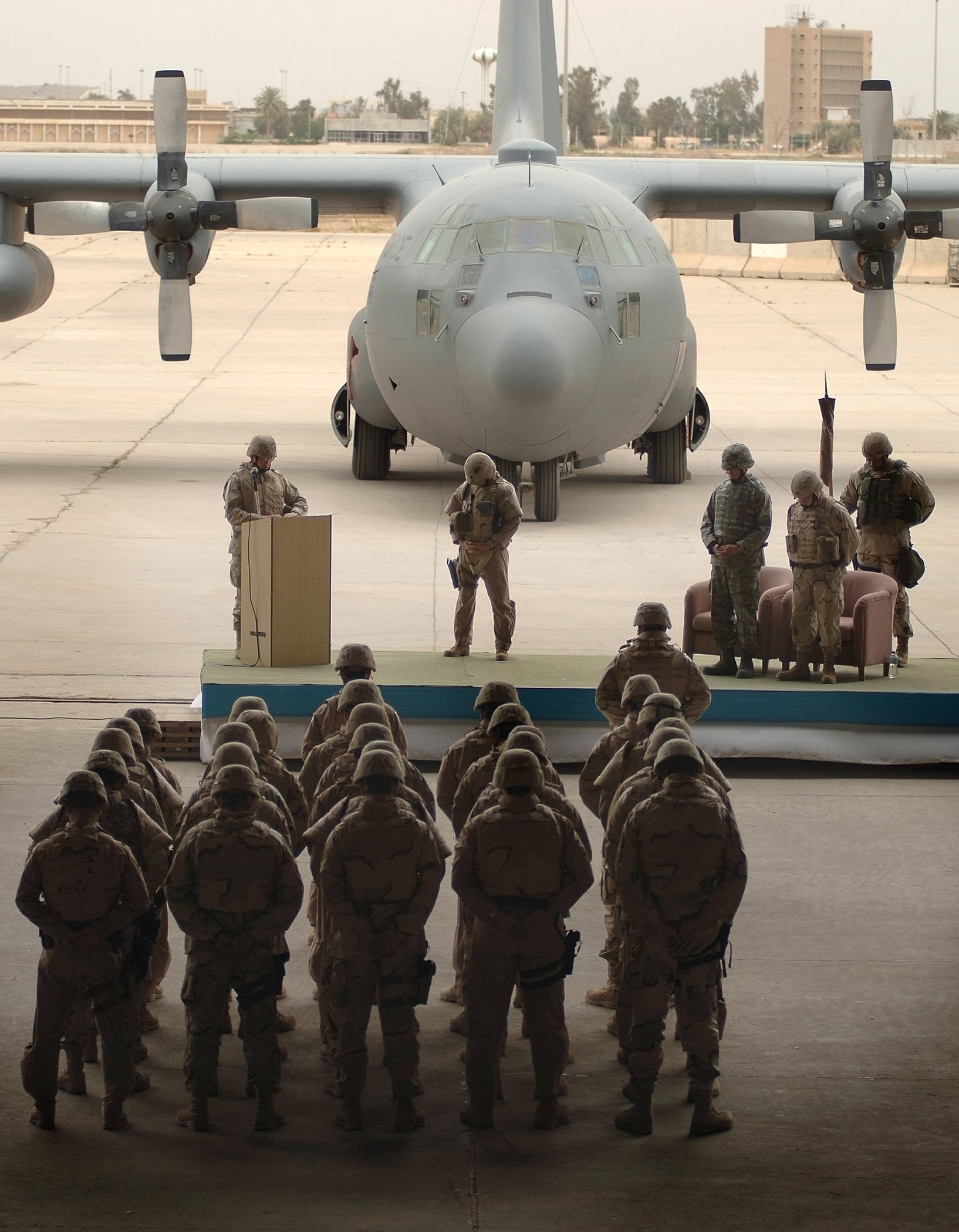
- The unit activation and assumption of command of the 370th Air Expeditionary Advisory Group and Squadron took place at New Al Muthana Air Base 22 April 2007
- Active: 1934; 1937–1944; 2007–2008
- Country: United States
- Branch: United States Air Force
- Role: Training
- Motto: Alatum Servitium (Latin for 'Winged Service')

Insignia
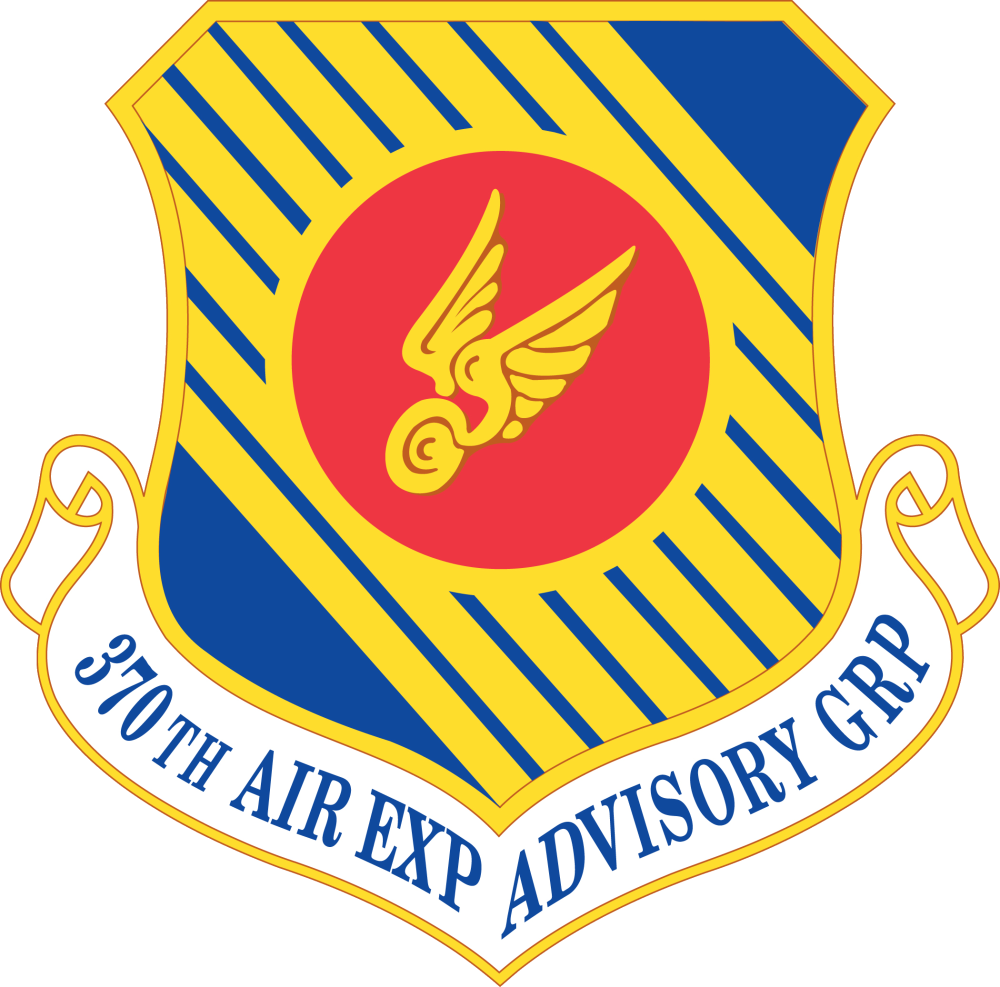
- 370th Air Expeditionary Advisory Group emblem

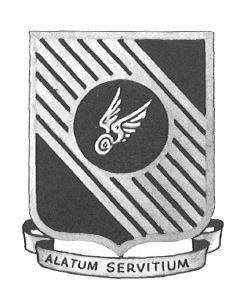
- 10th Troop Carrier Group Emblem (Note: Approved 9 December 1941. Description: Azure, ten bendlets or surmounted by a torteau fimbriated of the second [color] charged with a wheel winged bend sinisterwise of the like [color].)

The 370th Air Expeditionary Wing is a provisional United States Air Force unit assigned to United States Air Forces Central, which may activate or inactivate it at any time. The unit was last stationed in Iraq, and was likely inactivated in 2011 as part of the United States pullout of forces.

== History ==
=== Pre World War II ===
The 370th Air Expeditionary Wing was originally constituted as the 1st Transport Group in 1933. As a Regular Army Inactive unit, it was assigned reserve personnel in early 1934 only for training purposes. From February to May 1934, the group was provisionally organized at Columbus, Ohio.

In 1937, the group was consolidated with the 10th Observation Group, also constituted in 1933 but never activated. The consolidated group was designated the 10th Transport Group and activated on 20 May 1937. Its original squadrons were the 1st, 2d, 3d, and 4th Transport Squadrons. It provided a single headquarters for these squadrons, which had been assigned to the various Air Depots in the United States. The group headquarters and one of its squadrons were located at what is now Wright-Patterson Air Force Base, Ohio. It operated single-engine Bellanca C-27 Airbus and twin-engine Douglas C-33 transports as part of the logistics organization of the Air Corps on routes in the US and to Alaska and the Canal Zone, transporting supplies, materiel, and personnel.

In May 1941, two of the group's squadrons were reassigned to provide cadres for newly forming transport groups as the Air Corps expanded. The 3d Transport Squadron was reassigned to the 63d Transport Group, while the 4th Transport Squadron was reassigned to the 62d Transport Group This left the group with two of its original squadrons, plus the 5th Transport Squadron, which had activated under the group in 1939.

=== World War II ===
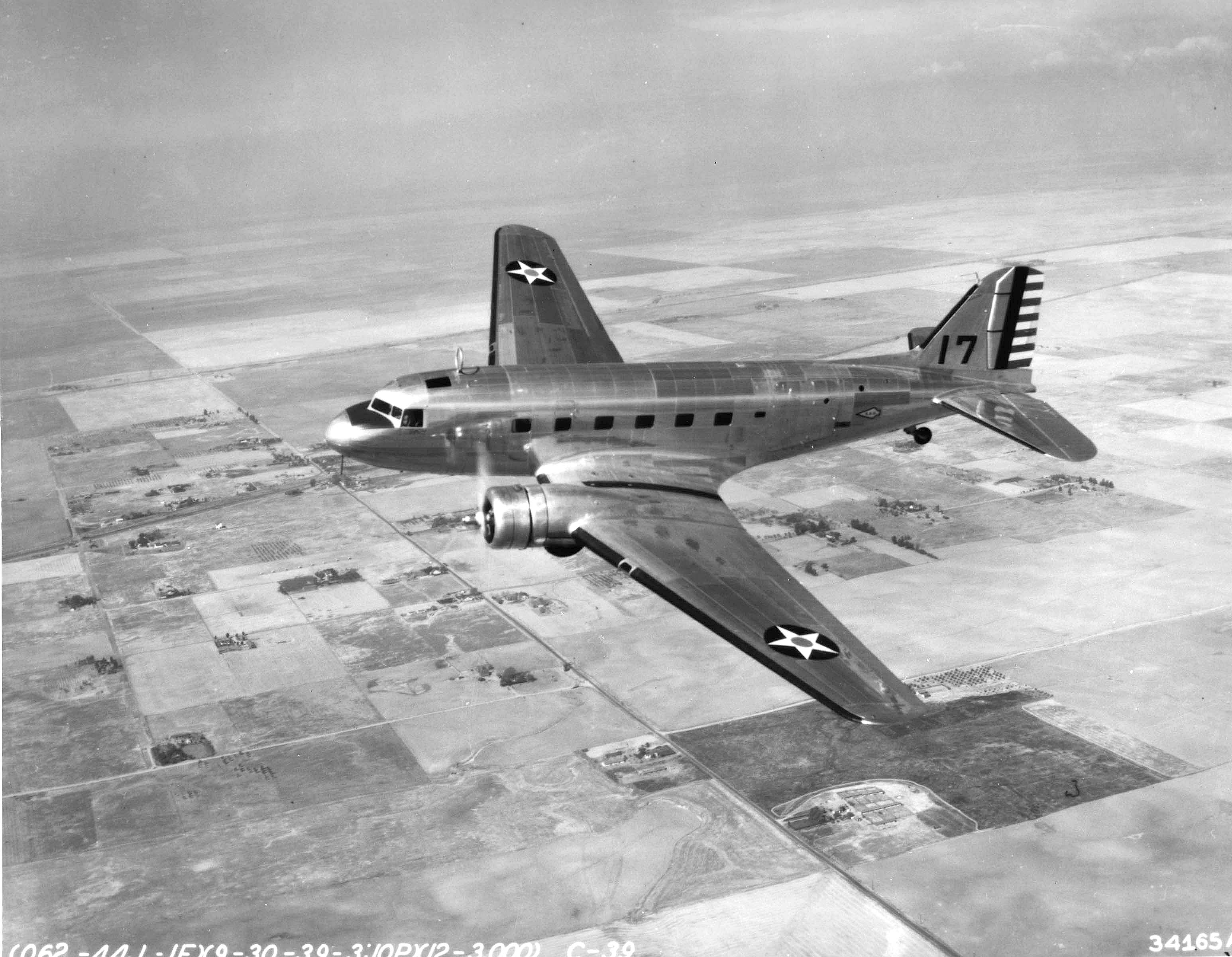
Douglas C-39 transport, a military modified version of the DC-2

On 30 April 1942, the group transferred to the Air Transport Command (later I Troop Carrier Command) (I TCC) and was redesignated as the 10th Troop Carrier Group two months later. It converted primarily to Douglas C-47 Skytrain aircraft, but also flew other military models of the Douglas DC-3. After its transfer the group acted as an Operational Training Unit (OTU), OTUs were oversized units that trained cadres for "satellite" troop carrier groups. In 1943 the group was given the additional duty of acting as a Replacement Training Unit training replacement aircrews. In February 1943, the last of the group's original squadrons, the 1st and 2d Troop Carrier Squadrons deployed to the China Burma India Theater and were assigned to Tenth Air Force. The following month, they were replaced by the 307th and 308th Troop Carrier Squadrons. During the next two years, the group moved frequently to various I TCC stations, while its squadrons were frequently located elsewhere. All squadrons except for the 38th Troop Carrier Squadron, located at Laurinburg-Maxton Army Air Base, North Carolina were colocated with group headquarters by early 1944.

The Army Air Forces found that standard military units, based on relatively inflexible tables of organization were proving less well adapted to performing the training mission. Accordingly, a more functional system was adopted in which each base was organized into a separate numbered unit. As a result, the 10th was disbanded in April 1944 and its mission, personnel, and equipment were combined with the support organizations at Alliance Army Air Field and transferred to the 805th AAF Base Unit (Replacement Training Unit, Troop Carrier), while that of the 38th Squadron was transferred to the 810th AAF Base Unit (Combat Crew Training School, Troop Carrier).

=== Expeditionary Service ===
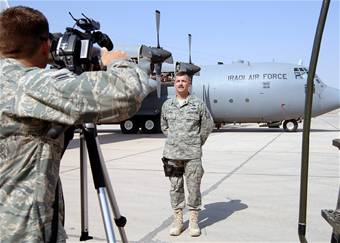
Airman 1st Class Brad Sisson, 322 AEW, tapes Tech. Sgt. Dale Peters doing a Hometown Holiday Greeting spot for his stateside family and friends

The 370th Air Expeditionary Advisory Group was activated during the Iraq War on 29 March 2007. Its activation ceremony at New Al Muthana Air Base was delayed until late April. The mission of the 370th was to restart the Iraqi Air Force by training its aircrews how to operate, employ and maintain Lockheed C-130 Hercules and Mil Mi-17 aircraft, and to maintain and operate as a self-sufficient air base. This mission was known as "CAFTT" for Coalition Air Forces Training Team. The group included personnel from a variety of career specialties and it was assigned to Second Air Force as part of Air Education and Training Command.

The group included the 52nd Expeditionary Flying Training Squadron, inactivated in December 2011 with the U.S. withdrawal from Iraq.

== Lineage ==
10th Observation Group

- Constituted on the inactive list as 10th Observation Group on 1 October 1933 (never active)

Consolidated with the 1st Transport Group as the 10th Transport Group on 20 May 1937ref name=Maurer52/>

370th Air Expeditionary Wing

- Constituted on the inactive list as 1st Transport Group on 1 October 1933 (Note: Not related to the 1st Transport Group, which was activated as the 1st Ferrying Group and served in India during World War II.)

Organized provisionally on 14 February 1934
Discontinued as a provisional organization on 11 May 1934
Consolidated with the 10th Observation Group as the 10th Transport Group, and activated, on 20 May 1937 (Note: Not related to the 10th Transport Group, which was activated as the 10th Ferrying Group and served in the Caribbean during World War II.)
Redesignated as: 10th Troop Carrier Group in July 1942.
Disbanded on 14 April 1944
Reconstituted and redesignated 370th Military Airlift Group on 31 July 1985
Redesignated 370th Air Expeditionary Group and converted to provisional status on 24 October 2005
Redesignated 370th Air Expeditionary Advisory Group on 23 March 2007
Activated on 29 March 2007
Inactivated on 1 November 2008

- Redesignated 370th Air Expeditionary Wing on 25 February 2010

Inactivated in December 2011

=== Assignments ===
- 6th Transport Wing, 14 February 1934 – 11 May 1934
- Office of Chief of the Air Corps, 20 May 1937
- 50th Transport Wing 4 January 1941
- 52nd Troop Carrier Wing, 4 October 1942
- I Troop Carrier Command, 13 February 1943 – 14 April 1944
- Air Education and Training Command to activate or inactivate any time after 23 March 2007 (Attached to: United States Air Forces Central)
- 9th Air Expeditionary Task Force, 29 March 2007 – 1 November 2008

=== Components ===
==== Airlift Squadrons ====
- 1st Transport Squadron (later Troop Carrier Squadron): 20 May 1937 – 2 February 1943
- 2d Transport Squadron (later Troop Carrier Squadron): 20 May 1937 – 2 February 1943

Olmsted Field, Pennsylvania

- 3d Transport Squadron: 20 May 1937 – 10 May 1941

Duncan Field, Texas

- 4th Transport Squadron: 20 May 1937 – 10 May 1941

Rockwell Field, California (moved to McClellan Field, California, with air depot).

- 5th Transport Squadron (later Troop Carrier Squadron): 14 October 1939 – 14 April 1944
- 27th Transport Squadron (later 27th Troop Carrier Squadron): 15 June 1942 – 5 August 1942 (detached to 62d Transport Group (later 62d Troop Carrier Group) 21 June 1942 – 5 August 1942)
- 38th Troop Carrier Squadron: 19 May 1943 – 14 April 1944
- 52nd Expeditionary Flying Training Squadron, inactivated 2011.
- 307th Troop Carrier Squadron: 15 March 1943 – 14 April 1944
- 308th Troop Carrier Squadron: 15 March 1943 – 14 April 1944

==== Support Units ====
- 1st Service Squadron: 14 February 1934 – 11 May 1934, 20 May 1937 – 1 January 1938
- 370th Air Expeditionary Advisory Squadron: 29 March 2007 – 1 November 2008

New Al Muthana Air Base, Iraq

- 370th Expeditionary Training Squadron: unknown – 1 November 2008

Camp Taji, Iraq

- 371st Air Expeditionary Advisory Squadron: 29 March 2007 – unknown
- 770th Air Expeditionary Advisory Squadron: unknown – 1 November 2008

Camp Taji, Iraq

- 870th Air Expeditionary Advisory Squadron:

Kirkuk, Iraq, 29 March 2007 – 1 November 2008

=== Stations ===
- Columbus, Ohio, 14 February 1934 – 11 May 1934
- Patterson Field, Ohio, 20 May 1937
- Wright Field, Ohio, 20 June 1938
- Patterson Field, Ohio, 17 January 1941
- Milwaukee County Airport (later General Billy Mitchell Field), Wisconsin, 25 May 1942
- Pope Field, North Carolina, 4 October 1942
- Dunnellon Army Air Field, Florida, 13 February 1943
- Lawson Field, Georgia, 30 November 1943
- Grenada Army Air Field, Mississippi, 21 January 1944
- Alliance Army Air Field, Nebraska, 8 March 1944 – 14 April 1944
- Baghdad, Iraq, 29 March 2007 – 1 November 2008

=== Aircraft ===
- Bellanca C-27 Airbus, 1937
- Douglas C-33, 1937–1939
- Douglas C-39, 1938–1942
- Douglas C-47 Skytrain, 1942–1944
- Douglas C-48, 1942
- Douglas C-53 Skytrooper, 1942–1944
- Lockheed C-130 Hercules, 2007–2008
- Aeronca L-3 Defender, 1943

=== Gliders ===
- Waco CG-4, 1943–1944
- Airspeed Horsa, 1943–1944
