= 2nd Airlift Squadron =

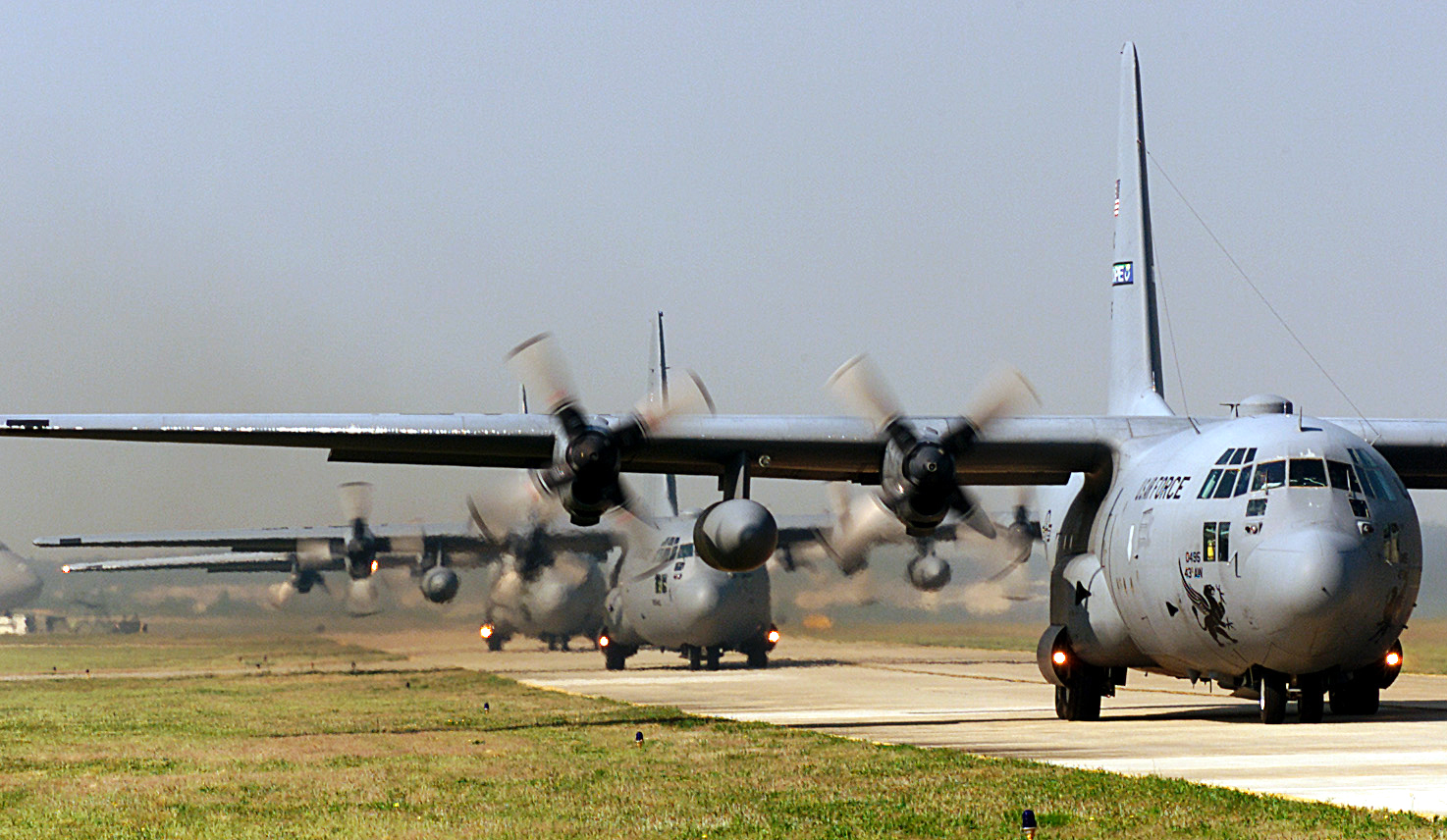
- C-130s taxiing at Pope Army Airfield
- Active: 1935–1945; 1992–2016
- Country: United States
- Branch: United States Air Force
- Role: Airlift
- Nickname: Lancers
- Engagements: China-Burma-India Theater
- Decorations: Distinguished Unit Citation

Insignia
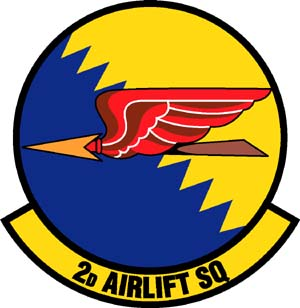
- 2nd Airlift Squadron emblem (Note: To comply with Air Force standards, all elements were moved within the disc after the squadron was reactivated in 1992. See Endicott, p. 325.)

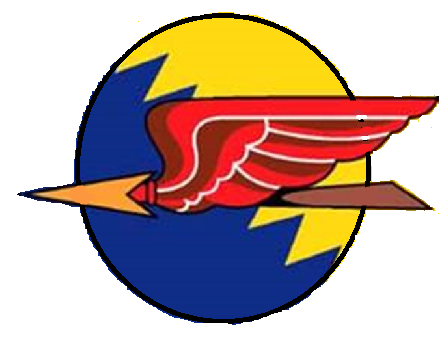
- 2nd Troop Carrier Squadron emblem (Note: Approved 5 May 1942. Description: Upon a disc per bend indented or and azure, a brown spear in fess, headed gold, winged gules.)

The 2nd Airlift Squadron is an inactive airlift of the United States Air Force squadron that specializes in airlift and transport missions. Established in 1940 as the 2nd Transport Squadron, the unit served primarily as a cargo and personnel transport squadron during World War II and subsequent conflicts. The squadron operated various transport aircraft throughout its history, including the C-47 Skytrain, C-124 Globemaster II, and C-141 Starlifter. Based at different times at Pope Air Force Base, North Carolina and McGuire Air Force Base, New Jersey, the 2nd Airlift Squadron participated in numerous military operations, humanitarian missions, and strategic airlifts before its inactivation. The squadron's extensive service record included supporting Allied operations in World War II, the Berlin Airlift, the Korean War, and operations in Vietnam, as well as later missions in the Middle East and humanitarian efforts worldwide.

== Mission ==
Provide the Department of Defense with highly trained, highly motivated, combat-ready aircrews who execute the best tactical airlift/airdrop operations in the United States Air Force.

== History ==
=== Early airlift in the Air Corps ===
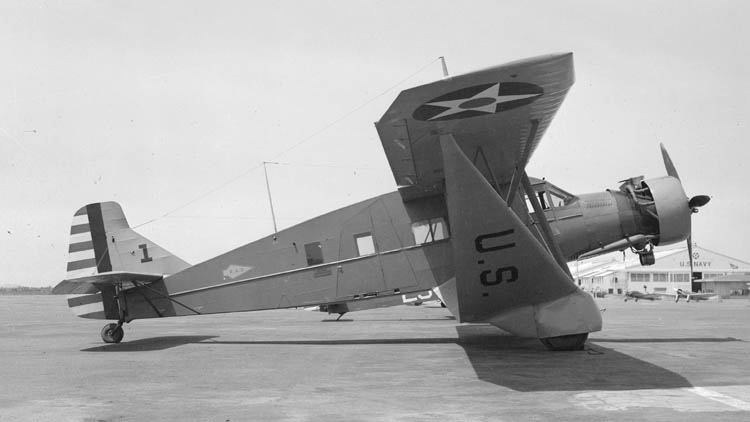
Bellanca C-27C

Prior to the early 1930s, transport aircraft in the Air Corps had been assigned to air depots and to service squadrons, although provisional transport squadrons had been formed for special projects. By 1932 Major Hugh J. Kerr, Chief of the Field Service Section of the Materiel Division, proposed the formation of a transport squadron at each air depot to act as a cadre for the transport wing the Air Corps proposed to support a field army in the event of mobilization. Major General Benjamin Foulois approved the formation of four provisional squadrons in November 1932.

The 2nd Provisional Transport Squadron was constituted in October 1933. By March 1934, it had become a Regular Army Inactive unit at Norton Field, Ohio, with reserve officers assigned.

In the spring of 1935, these squadrons, including the 2nd Transport Squadron at Olmsted Field, Pennsylvania, were made regular units and activated with Bellanca C-27 Airbus aircraft assigned. With enlisted men as pilots, the squadron hauled engines, parts, and other equipment to airfields in their assigned depot area, returned items to the depot, and transferred materiel between depots. They also furnished transportation for maneuvers. The rapid transport of supplies by the squadrons permitted the Air Corps to maintain low levels of materiel at its airfields, relying on replenishment from depot stocks only when needed.

In May 1937, the squadron was reassigned from the Middletown Air Depot to the newly activated 10th Transport Group, which assumed command of all four squadrons. The squadron received two-engine Douglas C-33s, the military version of the DC-2 in 1936 and Douglas C-39s (DC-2s with tail surfaces of the DC-3) in 1939 to replace the single engine Bellancas. These, and various other militarized DC-3s remained as the squadron's equipment until the entry of the United States into World War II.

=== World War II ===
The squadron trained transport pilots, 21 May-1 October 1942; transported troops and airdropped them during the airborne assault on Myitkyina, Burma, 17 May 1944; aerial transportation in China-Burma-India theater, 25 February 1943-c. August 1945; airlift of Chinese troops to eastern China for disarmament operations, September–November 1945. Airlift for airborne troops, 1 June 1992 – 2015.

=== Air Mobility Command ===
The squadron flew C-130H2 Hercules transport aircraft on airlift missions and shared these aircraft in an association with the Air Force Reserve Command's 440th Airlift Wing. After being moved to Pope in the 2005 BRAC, the 440th became the first Air Force Reserve Wing to have an active duty associate squadron.

== Lineage ==
- Constituted as the 2nd Provisional Transport Squadron on 1 March 1935

Redesignated 2nd Transport Squadron and activated on 28 June 1935
Redesignated 2nd Troop Carrier Squadron on 4 July 1942
Inactivated on 24 December 1945

- Redesignated 2nd Airlift Squadron and activated, on 1 June 1992

Inactivated 3 June 2016

=== Assignments ===
- Middletown Air Depot, 28 June 1935
- 10th Transport Group (later 10th Troop Carrier Group), 20 May 1937
- Tenth Air Force, c. 17 February 1943 (attached to India-China Wing, Air Transport Command, 9 March–1 July 1943)
- Assam Air Base Command, c. 1 July 1943 (attached to Troop Carrier Command, Eastern Air Command, 20 December 1943 – 6 March 1944)
- 443rd Troop Carrier Group, 6 March 1944 – 24 December 1945
- 23d Operations Group, 1 June 1992
- 43rd Operations Group (later 43rd Airlift Group), 1 April 1997 – 3 June 2016

=== Stations ===
- Olmsted Field, Pennsylvania, 28 June 1935
- Stout Field, Indiana, 21 May 1942
- Kellogg Field, Michigan, 1 July 1942
- Bowman Field, Kentucky, 4 August 1942
- Pope Field, North Carolina, 1 October 1942 – 23 January 1943
- Yangkai Airfield, China, 17 February 1943
- Dinjan Airfield, India, 1 July 1943
- Shingbwiyang, Burma, 14 August 1944
- Dinjan Airfield, India, 1 June 1945
- Chihkiang Airfield, China, 24 August 1945
- Hankow Airfield, China, 25 September–21 November 1945
- Camp Anza, California, 23–24 December 1945
- Pope Air Force Base (later Pope Army Airfield), North Carolina, 1 June 1992 – 3 June 2016

=== Aircraft ===
- Bellanca C-27 Airbus, 1935–1937
- Douglas C-33, 1936–1939
- Douglas C-39, 1939-1941
- Various civilian and military modifications of the Douglas DC-3, 1939-1941
- Douglas C-47 Skytrain, 1942–1945
- Curtiss C-46 Commando, 1945
- Lockheed C-130 Hercules, 1992–2016
