= 5th Troop Carrier Squadron =

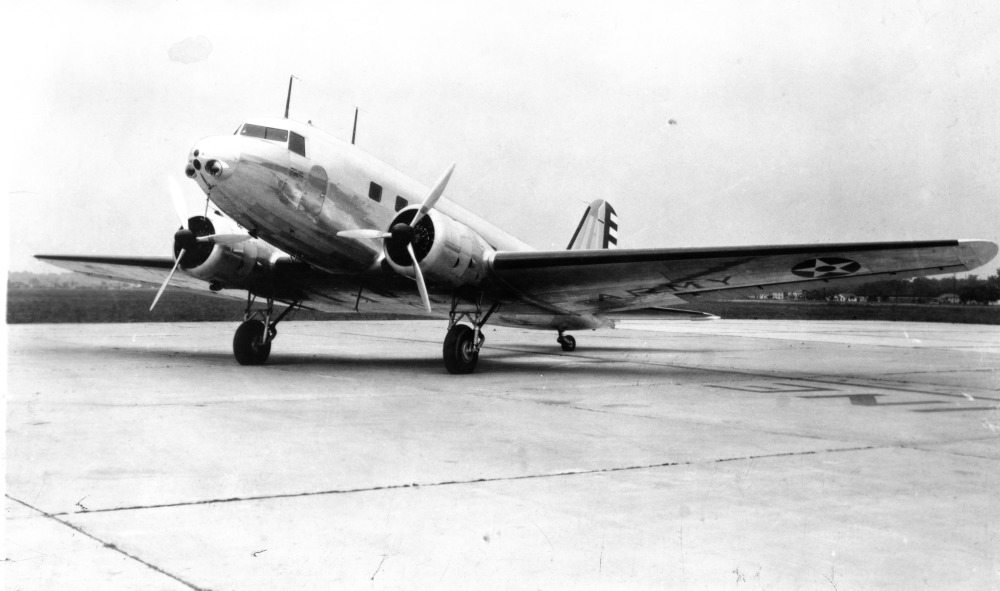
- Douglas C-33 as flown by the squadron
- Active: 1939–1944; 1947–1949
- Country: United States
- Branch: United States Air Force
- Role: Airlift

Insignia
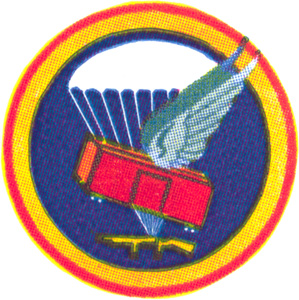
- 5th Troop Carrier Squadron emblem (4 October 1943)

The 5th Troop Carrier Squadron is an inactive United States Air Force squadron. Its last assignment was with Tenth Air Force at Selfridge Field, Michigan, where it was inactivated on 27 June 1949.

The squadron served as a training unit during the Second World War until it was disbanded in a general reorganization of Army Air Forces training units. It was reactivated briefly after the war in the United States Air Force Reserve.

== History ==
The squadron was an operational training unit prior to December 1942. It then served as a replacement training for glider crews. It also provided training for army airborne units, and ferried gliders from 1943 until disbanded in 1944.

The squadron was again activated in the reserve in 1947, but does not appear to have been fully manned or equipped before inactivating in 1949.

== Lineage ==
- Constituted as the 5th Transport Squadronon 1 October 1933
- Constituted on 1 October 1939

Activated on 14 October 1939
Redesignated 5th Troop Carrier Squadron on 4 July 1942
Disbanded on 14 April 1944

- Reconstituted on 25 August 1947

Activated in the reserve on 15 September 1947
Inactivated on 27 June 1949

=== Assignments ===
- 10th Transport Group (later 10th Troop Carrier Group), 14 October 1939 – 14 April 1944 (attached to 314th Troop Carrier Group, 22 February-8 April 1943)
- Second Air Force, 15 September 1947
- Tenth Air Force, 1 July 1948
- First Air Force, 15 August 1948
- 433d Troop Carrier Group, 28 October 1948
- Tenth Air Force, 28 March-27 June 1949

=== Stations ===
- Patterson Field, Ohio, 14 October 1939
- General Billy Mitchell Field, Wisconsin, 25 May 1942
- Pope Field, North Carolina, 4 October 1942
- Lawson Field, Georgia, 2 December 1942
- Grenada Army Air Field, Mississippi, 26 January 1944
- Alliance Army Air Field, Nebraska, c. 12 March-14 April 1944
- Selfridge Field, Michigan, 15 September 1947 – 27 June 1949

=== Aircraft ===
- Douglas C-33, 1939-1942
- Douglas C-39, 1939-1942
- Douglas C-47 Skytrain, 1941–1944
- Douglas C-53 Skytrooper, 1943–1944
- Aeronca L-3 Grasshopper, 1943
- Piper L-4 Grasshopper, 1943
