= 682 Air Support Operations Squadron =

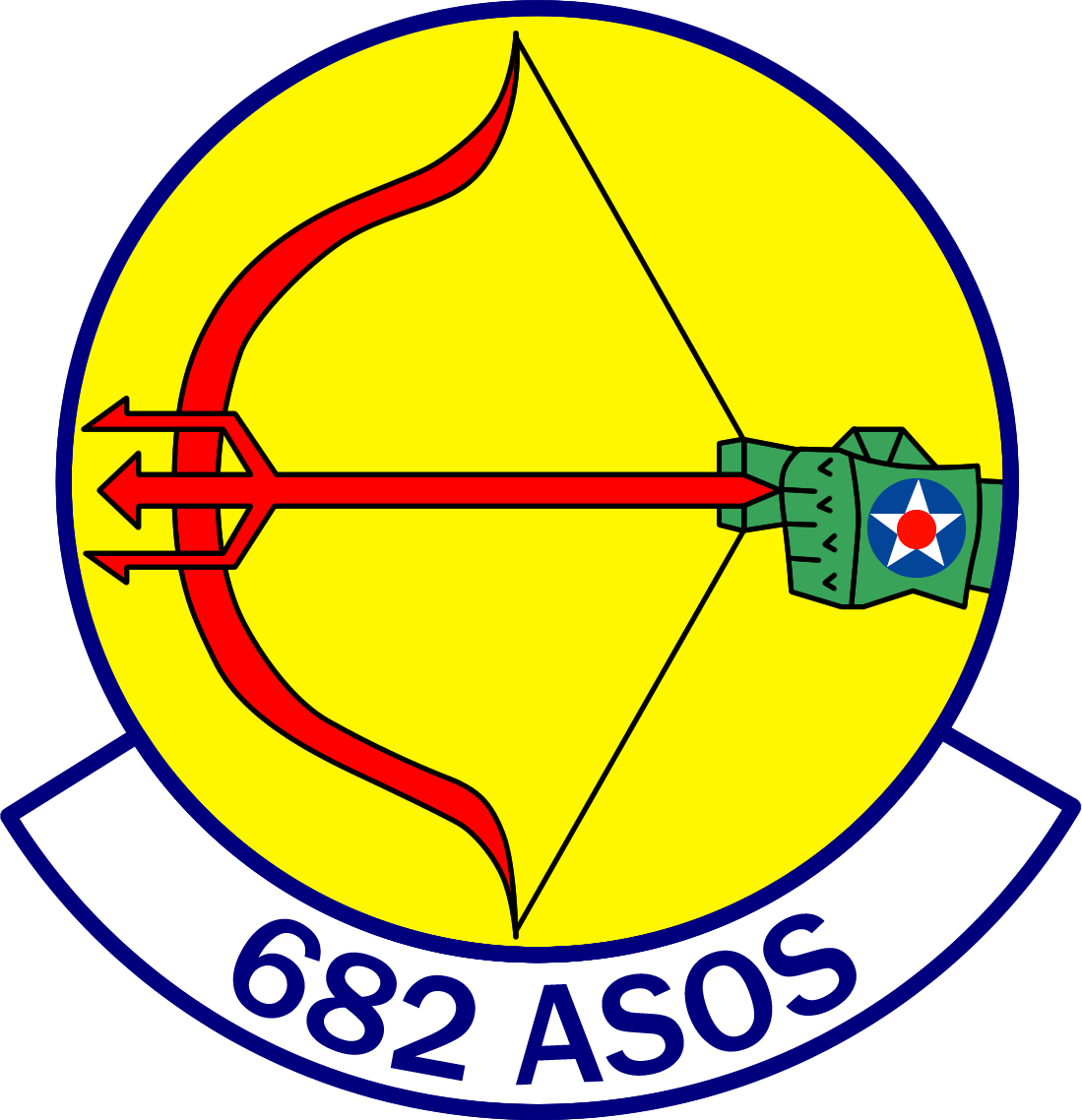
- Insignia
- Active: 1971–present
- Country: United States
- Branch: Air Force
- Type: Command and control
- Part of: Air Combat Command; 9th Air Force; 93d Air-Ground Operations Wing; 18th Air Support Operations Group
- Garrison/HQ: Pope Field
- Mascot(s): Condors
- Decorations: AFOUA AFMUA

The 682 Air Support Operations Squadron is an operational component of the Tactical Air Control System. The 682 DASOS is assigned to the 18th Air Support Operations Group, Pope Field, North Carolina, which is a direct reporting agency of 9th Air Force.

The unit's primary function is to coordinate and direct the tactical air effort in the support of land forces and provide fast reaction to satisfy immediate requests from the Army for close air support. The ASOS provides advice and assistance to Army commanders concerning the employment of all Air Force resources and may be granted scramble and control authority over sorties designated to fulfill Army requirements.

The squadron is aligned with the Army's 18th Airborne Corps, but also supports United States Army Central (ARCENT).

When deployed, the ASOS forms an Air Support Operations Center (ASOC) under the operational control of the Joint Forces Air Component Commander (JFACC), through the Air Operations Center (AOC).

The 682 DASOS employs several types of communication systems. Capabilities include tactical satellite, troposcatter, line-of-site, and other various radio systems for communicating with air and ground forces.
