= Pope Air Force Base Historic District =

Historic district in North Carolina, United States

- U.S. National Register of Historic Places
- U.S. Historic district
- Location within North Carolina Location within the United States
- Location: Bldgs. 300, 302, 306, and Old Family Housing Units, Fayetteville, North Carolina
- Coordinates: 35°10′13″N 79°00′13″W
- Area: 15.5 acres (6.3 ha)
- Built: 1933-1934
- MPS: Pope Air Force Base Early Expansion MPS
- NRHP reference No.: 90002152
- Added to NRHP: January 25, 1991

Pope Air Force Base Historic District is a national historic district located at Fayetteville, Cumberland County, North Carolina. It encompasses 32 contributing buildings on the grounds of Pope Air Force Base. They were built in 1933-1934 during the first base expansion and include single administrative buildings and dwellings with associated outbuildings. Notable buildings include the three-story, Georgian Revival style Fleming Hall; the Old Fire Station; and 21 Old Family Housing Units.

It was listed on the National Register of Historic Places in 1991.
