= Hangars 4 and 5, Pope Air Force Base =

- U.S. National Register of Historic Places
- Location within North Carolina Location within the United States
- Location: Bldg. 708, Pope AFB, Fayetteville, North Carolina
- Coordinates: 35°10′40″N 79°0′52″W
- Area: 1 acre (0.40 ha)
- Built: 1934
- MPS: Pope Air Force Base Early Expansion MPS
- NRHP reference No.: 90002153
- Added to NRHP: January 16, 1991

Pope Air Force Base Historic District is a historic airplane hangar located at Pope Air Force Base, Fayetteville, Cumberland County, North Carolina. It was built in 1934, and has a double-bay metal superstructure resting on a concrete foundation and floor. It is of bowstring truss construction. The building measures 333 feet, 6 inches, by 124 feet.

It was listed on the National Register of Historic Places in 1991.
