= Norton Field =

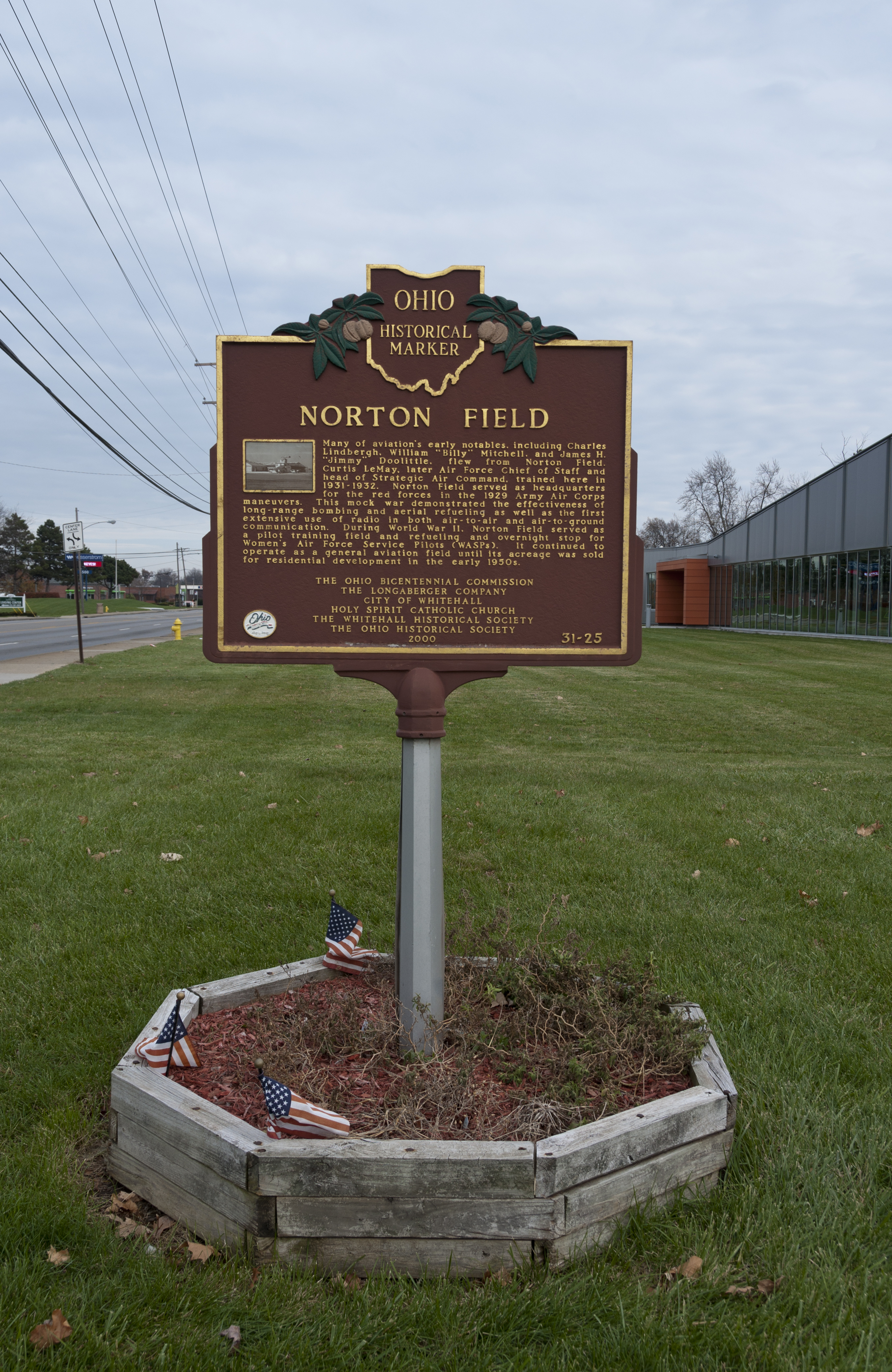
- Norton Field Historical Marker
- IATA: none; ICAO: none

Summary
- Location: Columbus, Ohio
- Coordinates: 39.97°N 82.88°W
- Interactive map of Norton Field

Norton Field was an aviation landing field, located in Columbus, Ohio, that operated from 1923 until the early 1950s. It was the first airport established in Central Ohio, and was named for World War I pilot and star Ohio State University athlete Fred William Norton, a Columbus native. Lieutenant Norton, of the 27th Pursuit Squadron, died of injuries suffered when his Nieuport 28 was shot down in northern France by anti-aircraft artillery in July 1918. Although he managed to land safely behind Allied lines, it took two days to transport him to medical care during which time he contracted pneumonia, dying on 23 July 1918.

== History ==
Norton Field was located in an area southwest of present East Broad Street, Fairway Boulevard, and Hamilton Road in Whitehall, Ohio, just south of what is now John Glenn Columbus International Airport. It was dedicated on 30 June 1923, in a ceremony attended by top American ace and Columbus native Captain Eddie Rickenbacker. The flying field was established at the urging of Aero Club of Columbus, who lobbied the War Department for its creation. The 100-acre (40 ha) property, with dimensions of 2,000 by 2,250 feet (610 m × 690 m), received a 10-year lease, secured from Jim Lamp and paid for by the Pure Oil Company, according to Ohio Aviation News (Fall 2000). This property was then provided to the War Department. "For $1 a year as the community’s part of the deal, Norton Field was equipped by the War Department with 2 steel hangars, a fueling dock & a beacon light on a tower." The first delivery of air mail to Columbus occurred on the day of its dedication. Norton Field became the headquarters for the 308th Observation Squadron, made up of local reservists, many of whom were members of the Aero Club.

Many of aviation's early notables, including Charles Lindbergh, William “Billy” Mitchell, and James H. “Jimmy” Doolittle, flew from Norton Field. Curtis LeMay, later Air Force Chief of Staff and head of Strategic Air Command, trained here in 1931-1932. Norton Field served as headquarters for the red forces in the 1929 Army Air Corps maneuvers, known as the Great Ohio Air War. This mock war demonstrated the effectiveness of long-range bombing and aerial refueling as well as the first extensive use of radio in both air-to-air and air-to-ground communication.

Charles Lindbergh visited Norton Field on 29 May 1928 as a Technical Advisor for Transcontinental Air Transport, surveying a cross country train-plane route. He found the field to be too small for TAT’s needs and recommended the city build a larger facility adjacent to the tracks of the Pennsylvania Railroad. This brought about the construction of Port Columbus in 1929. The U.S. Army relocated its operations to Port Columbus in June 1931.

During World War II, Norton Field served as a pilot training field with a civilian flight school operated by Mid West Aviation Corporation and a refueling and overnight stop for Women Airforce Service Pilots (WASPs).

Following World War II, it continued to serve as a general aviation airport until its acreage was sold for residential development in the early 1950s.
