= 3d Troop Carrier Squadron =

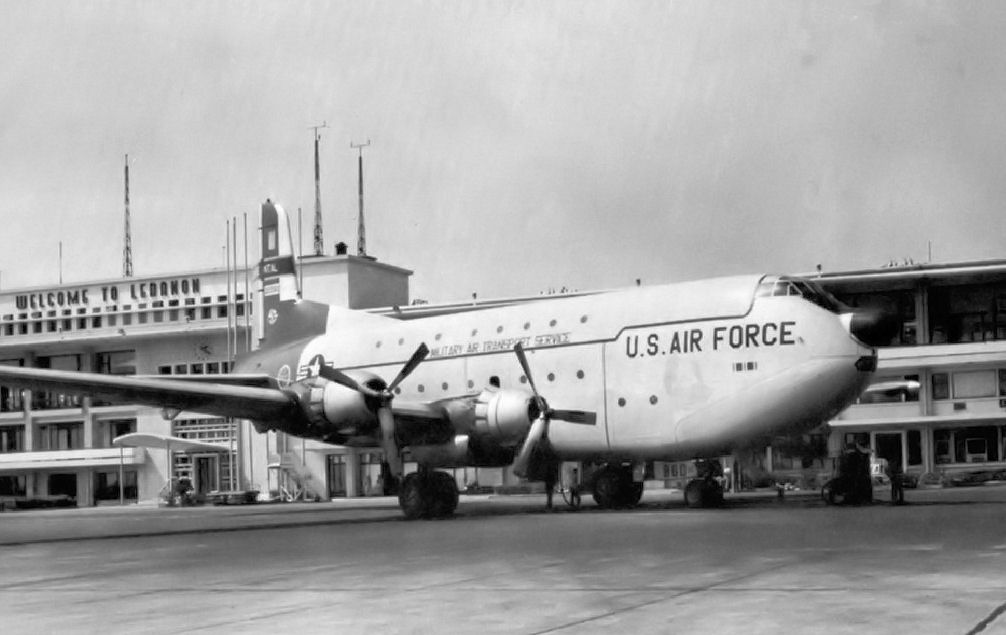
- 63d Troop Carrier Wing C-124 Globemaster II during the Lebanon Crisis of 1958
- Active: 1935–1944; 1947–1951; 1953–1960
- Country: United States
- Branch: United States Air Force
- Role: Airlift
- Part of: Military Air Transport Service
- Decorations: Air Force Outstanding Unit Award

Insignia
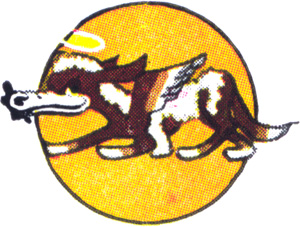
- 3d Troop Carrier Squadron emblem (approved 10 September 1943)

The 3d Troop Carrier Squadron is an inactive United States Air Force unit. It was last assigned to the 63d Troop Carrier Group at Donaldson Air Force Base, South Carolina, where it was inactivated in 1960.

The squadron was one of the earliest airlift units of the United States Army Air Corps, first activating in 1935 as the 3d Transport Squadron. During World War II, the squadron acted as a training unit until disbanded in 1944.

After the end of the war, the squadron was again active in the reserve from 1947 until mobilized for the Korean War in 1951, transferring its personnel and equipment to other organizations before inactivating. Its last active period began in 1953, when it was equipped with Douglas C-124 Globemaster IIs as a heavy troop carrier unit.

== History ==
=== Early Air Corps airlift ===
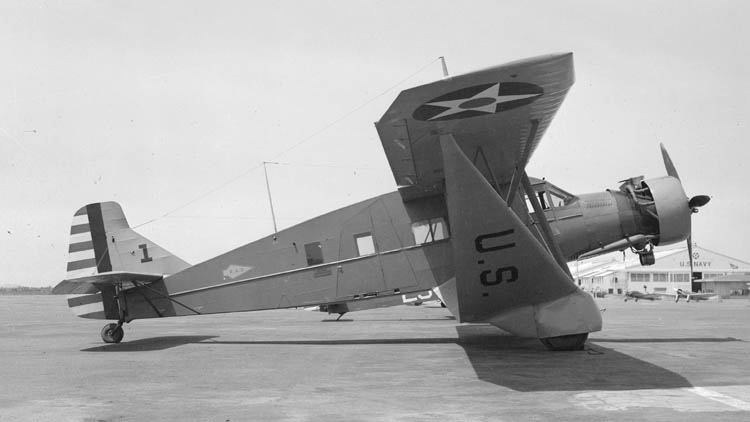
Bellanca C-27C

Prior to the early 1930s, transport aircraft in the Air Corps had been assigned to air depots and to service squadrons, although provisional transport squadrons had been formed for special projects. By 1932 Major Hugh J. Kerr, Chief of the Field Service Section of the Materiel Division, proposed the formation of a transport squadron at each air depot to act as a cadre for the transport wing the Air Corps proposed to support a field army in the event of mobilization. Major General Benjamin Foulois approved the formation of four provisional squadrons in November 1932.

The 3d Provisional Transport Squadron was constituted in October 1933 and allotted to the Fifth Corps Area. By March 1934 it was a Regular Army Inactive unit at Schoen Field, Indiana. Although inactive, it had reserve officers assigned.

In the spring of 1935, the first transport squadrons, including the 3d Transport Squadron at Duncan Field, Texas, were made regular units and activated with Bellanca C-27 Airbus aircraft assigned. With enlisted men as pilots, the squadron hauled engines, parts, and other equipment to airfields in their assigned depot area, returned items to the depot, and transferred materiel between depots. They also furnished transportation for maneuvers. The rapid transport of supplies by the squadrons permitted the Air Corps to maintain low levels of materiel at its airfields, relying on replenishment from depot stocks only when needed.

In May 1937, the squadron was reassigned from the San Antonio Air Depot to the newly-activated 10th Transport Group, which assumed command of all four squadrons. The squadron received two-engine Douglas C-33s, the military version of the DC-2 in 1936 and Douglas C-39s (DC-2s with tail surfaces of the DC-3) in 1939 to replace the single engine Bellancas. These, and various other militarized DC-3s remained as the squadron's equipment until the entry of the United States into World War II.

=== World War II ===
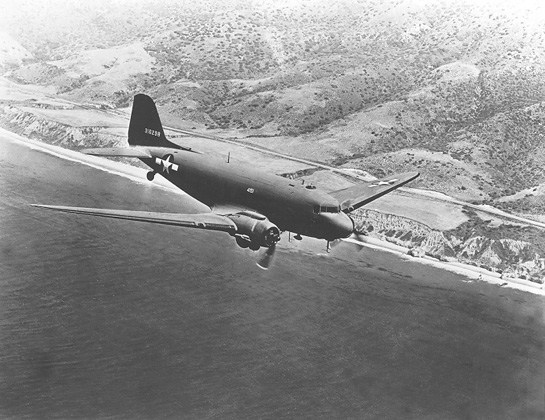
C-47 as flown by the squadron during World War II

As the United States began to build up its armed forces prior to its entry into World War II, it formed several new transport groups. In May 1941, the 3d was reassigned to one of these, the 63d Transport Group. Not until May 1942, after the 63d Group was reassigned to Air Transport Command, (Note: This unit became the I Troop Carrier Command in July, and should not be confused with Air Transport Command, which was still the Air Corps Ferrying Command in early 1942.) did the squadron and group headquarters (which had been located at Wright Field, Ohio) join at Camp Williams Army Air Field, Wisconsin. In July 1942, the squadron became the 3d Troop Carrier Squadron in a renaming of all Army Air Forces transport units.

It was decided that the 63d Group would become a Douglas C-47 Skytrain training organization and it and its squadrons moved south, where more favorable flying weather could be found. The group initially acted as an Operational Training Unit (OTU). The OTU program involved the use of an oversized parent unit to provide cadres to "satellite" groups. In July 1943, its mission switched to acting as a Replacement Training Unit (RTU). RTUs were also oversized units which trained aircrews prior to their deployment to combat theaters. However, the Army Air Forces found that standard military units, based on relatively inflexible tables of organization, were not well adapted to the training mission. Accordingly, it adopted a more functional system in which each base was organized into a separate numbered unit, while the groups and squadrons acting as RTUs were disbanded or inactivated. This resulted in the squadron disbanding on 14 April 1944 and transferring its personnel and equipment to the 813th AAF Base Unit (Combat Crew Training School, Troop Carrier).

=== Air Force reserve ===
In 1947, the squadron was reconstituted as a reserve unit under Air Defense Command at Burlington Municipal Airport, Iowa and assigned directly to Second Air Force. Realignment of reserve areas of responsibility and transfer of the reserve program to Continental Air Command (ConAC) in 1948 resulted in a reassignment of the squadron to Tenth Air Force. In June 1949, the squadron moved to Fort Slocum, New York and was assigned to First Air Force. The squadron does not appear to have been manned or equipped during this period.

In June 1949, ConAC reorganized its reserve units under the wing base organization system, in which tactical and support units on a base were organized under a single wing. In this reorganization, the squadron moved to Floyd Bennett Field, New York and was once more assigned to the 63d Troop Carrier Group. With the 63d, the squadron, which was manned at only 25% of its authorized strength, trained under the supervision of the 2230th Air Force Reserve Training Center and performed limited troop carrier operations with the Skytrain beginning in the middle of 1950.

The 3d, along with all reserve combat units, were mobilized for the Korean war. The squadron was called to active duty on 1 May 1951. Its personnel and equipment were transferred to other units and the squadron was inactivated on 9 May.

=== Heavy troop carrier operations ===
The squadron was activated as a heavy troop carrier unit at Altus Air Force Base, Oklahoma in June 1953 and equipped with Douglas C-124 Globemaster IIs as part of Tactical Air Command (TAC). After initial training, the unit moved to Donaldson Air Force Base, South Carolina that fall. At Donaldson, the squadron trained, transported personnel and supplies and participated in exercises with airborne troops. In the spring of 1955, the squadron transported construction materiel from main bases in southern Canada to locations north of the Arctic Circle to establish the Distant Early Warning Line. The operation was conducted in harsh weather with limited navigational equipment, earning the squadron an Air Force Outstanding Unit Award.

The squadron also participated in resupply of temporary scientific research bases established on ice islands in the Arctic. On the opposite end of the world, it provided crews and aircraft supporting Antarctic research in Operation Deep Freeze. After 1956, the squadron contributed to the rotational squadron-sized unit maintained by the 63d Troop Carrier Wing in Europe. In 1957, C-124 heavy troop carrier operations were transferred from TAC to Military Air Transport Service (MATS), which also operated the Globemaster II in the strategic airlift role.

In July 1958, President Eisenhower directed the implementation of Operation Blue Bat, the deployment of a Composite Air Strike Force, to support the United States Sixth Fleet, which had landed marines in Lebanon in response to the crisis there. Globemasters began to depart from Donaldson on the evening of 14 July, and by 17 July 44 wing aircraft were deployed to Rhein Main Air Base, Germany, including the detachment already maintained there. Some of these planes moved to Erding and Fürstenfeldbruck Air Bases to move the Army's Task Force Alpha to Adana, Turkey to support forces in Lebanon. Despite delays caused by congestion at the airports at Adana and Beirut, the task force was in place by 19 July. While operating as part of the Composite Air Strike Force, unit planes and crews fell under the operational control of the 322d Air Division. Once the crisis had abated, Operation Hat Rack, the withdrawal of Army forces began, ending on 28 October.

In late 1959, MATS began to consolidate its C-124 units at Donaldson, beginning by inactivating the 61st Troop Carrier Group and transferring its squadrons to the 63d Group. As the consolidations continued, the squadron was inactivated in December 1960.

== Lineage ==
- Constituted as the 3d Provisional Transport Squadron, a provisional organization, on 1 October 1933
- Constituted as the 3d Provisional Transport Squadron, a permanent organization, on 1 March 1935

Redesignated 3d Transport Squadron on 25 June 1935
Activated on 5 July 1935
Redesignated 3d Troop Carrier Squadron on 4 July 1942
Disbanded on 14 April 1944

- Reconstituted on 5 September 1947

Activated in the reserve on 6 October 1947
Redesignated 3d Troop Carrier Squadron, Medium on 27 June 1949
Ordered to active service on 1 May 1951
Inactivated on 9 May 1951

- Redesignated 3d Troop Carrier Squadron, Heavy on 19 March 1953

Activated on 20 June 1953
Discontinued and inactivated on 8 December 1960

=== Stations ===
- Schoen Field, Indiana (inactive with reserve officers assigned)
- Duncan Field, Texas 25 June 1935
- Camp Williams Army Air Field, Wisconsin 29 May 1942
- Dodd Field, Texas, 18 September 1942
- Victorville Army Air Field, California, 16 November 1942
- Lawson Field, Georgia, 7 May 1943
- Grenada Army Air Field, Mississippi, 3 June 1943
- Sedalia Army Air Field, Missouri, 19 January–14 April 1944
- Burlington Municipal Airport, Iowa 6 October 1947
- Fort Slocum, New York, 6 June 1949
- Floyd Bennett Field, New York, 27 June 1949 – 9 May 1951
- Altus Air Force Base, Oklahoma, 20 June 1953
- Donaldson Air Force Base, South Carolina 15 October 1953 – 8 December 1960

=== Assignments ===
- 1st Transport Group, 1 October 1933
- San Antonio Air Depot 25 June 1935
- 10th Transport Group, 20 May 1937
- 63d Transport Group (later 63d Troop Carrier Group), 10 May 1941 – 14 April 1944
- Second Air Force 6 October 1947
- Tenth Air Force, 1 July 1948
- First Air Force, 6 June 1949
- 63d Troop Carrier Group, 27 Jun 1949 – 9 May 1951
- 63d Troop Carrier Group 15 October 1953 – 8 December 1960

=== Aircraft ===
- Bellanca C-27 Airbus, 1935-1937
- Douglas C-33, 1936-1941
- Douglas C-39, 1938-1942
- Douglas C-53 Skytrooper, 1942-1943
- Douglas C-47 Skytrain, 1942-1944
- Douglas C-124 Globemaster II, 1953-1960

=== Awards and campaigns ===
Award streamer	Award	Dates	Notes
	Air Force Outstanding Unit Award	2 March 1955–31 May 1955	3d Troop Carrier Squadron

Campaign Streamer	Campaign	Dates	Notes
	American Theater without inscription	7 December 1941 – 14 April 1944	3d Troop Carrier Squadron

== See also ==
- List of United States Air Force airlift squadrons
- List of Douglas C-47 Skytrain operators
