= Pope Field =

US military airfield at Fort Bragg, near Fayetteville, North Carolina, United States

- Pope Army Airfield
- Part of Fort Bragg
- Near Fayetteville, North Carolina in the United States
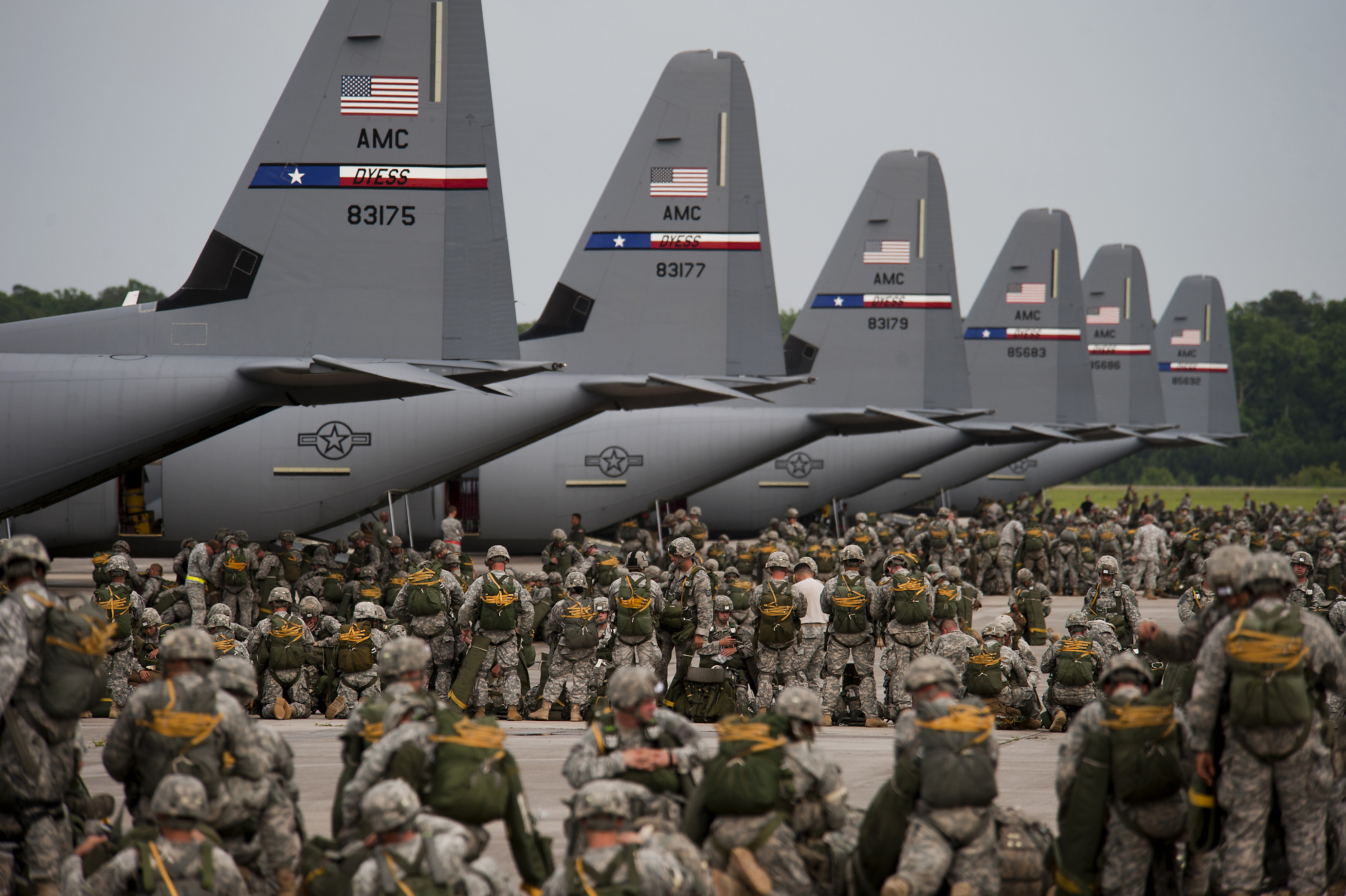
- Soldiers from the US Army 82nd Airborne Division prepare for a mass parachute jump from US Air Force C-130J Hercules during an exercise at Pope Field in 2013.

Site information
- Type: US Army Air Field
- Owner: Department of Defense
- Operator: US Army; US Air Force
- Controlled by: Fort Bragg Garrison; Air Mobility Command
- Condition: Operational
- Website: www.pope.af.mil

Location
- Coordinates: 35°10′15″N 79°00′52″W

Site history
- Built: 1919 (as Camp Bragg)
- In use: 1919–1947 (Pope Field); 1947–2011 (Pope AFB); 2011–present (Pope Field)
- Events: Green Ramp disaster (1994)

Garrison information
- Garrison: 43rd Air Mobility Operations Group (USAF)

Airfield information
- Identifiers: IATA: POB, ICAO: KPOB, FAA LID: POB, WMO: 723030
- Elevation: 66.4 metres (218 ft) AMSL
Runways
Direction	Length and surface
05/23	2,895.9 metres (9,501 ft) Porous European Mix
Assault Strip	914.4 metres (3,000 ft) Asphalt

Pope Field (IATA: POB, ICAO: KPOB, FAA LID: POB) is a U.S. military facility located 12 miles (19 km) northwest of the central business district of Fayetteville, in Spring Lake, Cumberland County, North Carolina, United States. Formerly known as Pope Air Force Base, the facility is now operated by the U.S. Air Force via a memorandum of agreement (MOA) and an interservices support agreement (ISSA) with the U.S. Army as part of Fort Bragg.

== History ==
=== Origins ===
In 1918, Congress established Camp Bragg, an Army field artillery site named for the Confederate general Braxton Bragg. An aviation landing field was added a year later. The War Department officially established "Pope Field" in 1919, and it ranks as one of the oldest installations in the Air Force.

Pope AFB is named after First Lieutenant Harley Halbert Pope who was killed on 7 January 1919, when the Curtiss JN-4 Jenny he was flying crashed into the Cape Fear River. After five years, Camp Bragg became a permanent Army post renamed Fort Bragg, and known as Fort Liberty from 2023 to early-2025.

Original operations included photographing terrain for mapping, carrying the mail, and spotting for artillery and forest fires. Observation planes and observation balloons occupied Pope Field for the first eight years. In December 1927, Pope Field played a role in the development of tactics that would prove critically important in shortening World War II.

The 1930s saw the first major expansion of the facilities at Pope. In 1935, Pope Field hosted 535 aircraft in one day as the United States Army Air Corps practiced large scale operations along the East Coast. In 1940, paved runways replaced dirt open fields. Much of the parking ramp space remained unpaved until after World War II.

The tempo of activities at Pope quickened with the outbreak of World War II. During the 1940s, the base swelled as a troop carrier training site, and with the institution of paratrooper training at Fort Bragg, Pope began putting the "Air" in "Airborne". Throughout the war, air and ground crews trained here with Army airborne units in preparation for airborne and aerial resupply missions.

Pope Field became Pope Air Force Base in 1947 and changed back to Pope Field in 2011.

Hangars 4 and 5 and the Pope Air Force Base Historic District were listed on the National Register of Historic Places in 1991.

=== 10th Tactical Reconnaissance Group ===
After the war, Pope Field became Pope Air Force Base with the creation of the United States Air Force on 18 September 1947. The base served as the home of the 10th Tactical Reconnaissance Group, being activated at Pope on 3 December 1947 as the 10th Reconnaissance Group. It was redesignated as the 10th Tactical Reconnaissance Group in June 1948. At Pope, the 10th flew the P/F-51 Mustang, as well as its photo recon variant the F-6, later redesignated the RF-51. Operational squadrons were:

- 1st Photographic Reconnaissance
- 15th Photographic Reconnaissance

=== 4415th Air Base Group ===
The 10th TRG was inactivated on 1 April 1949 and the host unit at Pope was the 4415th Air Base Group. The base primary mission dealt with training Forward Air Controllers for the Korean War This training was conducted by the following operational units:

- 502d Tactical Control Group (27 June 1949 – 27 August 1950)
- 507th Tactical Control Group (2 September 1950 – 1 July 1954)

Headquarters, Ninth Air Force, was located at Pope in August 1950. It was transferred to Shaw Air Force Base, South Carolina, on 20 August 1954.

=== 464th Troop Carrier Wing ===
On 21 September 1954, Ninth Air Force turned Pope over to the 464th Troop Carrier Wing, a Tactical Air Command unit, which transferred from Lawson Air Force Base, Georgia. Known operational squadrons of the 464th were:

- 776th Troop Carrier Squadron (transferred to Pacific Air Forces in December 1965)
- 777th Troop Carrier Squadron
- 778th Troop Carrier Squadron
- 779th Troop Carrier Squadron

The 464th (on 1 August 1966 all troop carrier units were redesignated as "tactical airlift") provided airlift of troops and cargo, participated in joint airborne training with Army forces, and took part in tactical exercises in the United States and overseas. The wing provided aeromedical airlift and flew humanitarian missions as required. Until it was inactivated, the 464th usually had two or more squadrons deployed overseas at any one time, supporting military operations in Central America, Europe, the Middle East, the Far East, and Southeast Asia.

The 464th received the Mackay Trophy for the dramatic RED DRAGON/DRAGON ROUGE and BLACK DRAGON/DRAGON NOIR hostage rescue missions in the Congo in 1964. The wing led the deployment of 82nd Airborne forces to the Dominican Republic, April 1965-September 1966. Beginning in 1966, the 464th was responsible for training C-130E aircrew members for duty in troop carrier units in the United States and overseas.

During its time at Pope, a major period of facility expansion occurred. The main runway, the taxiways, and the ramp were all expanded to support the 464th's Fairchild C-119 "Flying Boxcar"s operations. During the 1950s and 1960s, aircraft upgrade was the primary trend at the North Carolina installation. The Fairchild C-123 Provider started replacing the C-119 in 1958, and in 1963, the first C-130 Hercules arrived, appropriately named "The North Carolina".

=== 317th Tactical Airlift Wing ===
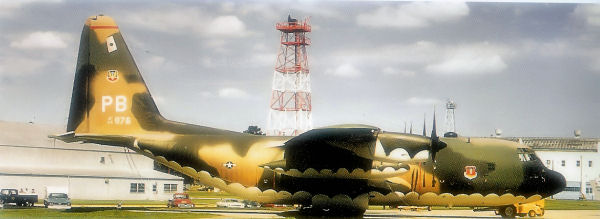
C-130E Serial 63-7876 of the 41st Tactical Airlift Squadron during the Vietnam War.

In August 1971, the 464th inactivated and the 317th Tactical Airlift Wing administratively moved to Pope AFB from Lockbourne AFB, Ohio. Known operational squadrons and tail codes of the 317th were:

- 39th Tactical Airlift Squadron (PB – blue tail stripe)
- 40th Tactical Airlift Squadron (PG/PB – green tail stripe)
- 41st Tactical Airlift Squadron (PR/PB – red tail stripe)

The 317th TAW flew the C-130E aircraft. After June 1972, the squadron tail codes were standardized with "PB", representing (Pope/Bragg).

The drop zones, low-level routes, and dirt landing zones at Fort Bragg became familiar to many men bound for Southeast Asia. The training gained in operating in the North Carolina area immeasurably improved aircrew preparedness for combat duty. The wing was a pioneer in the use of adverse weather aerial delivery system (AWADS) equipment in active combat operations in Southeast Asia, and after the end of American involvement, trained European-based NATO aircrews in those same techniques.

During the Vietnam War, Pope was the destination for the bodies of servicemen killed in Southeast Asia. When identification was confirmed, the bodies were sent to their hometowns or the appropriate military cemeteries for burial.

On 1 December 1974 the Military Airlift Command took responsibility for tactical airlift and assumed command of Pope with all of its assigned units. Under MAC, the two-digit tail code designation of the 317th's aircraft was removed.

On 1 January 1992 the 317th TAW was reassigned to Air Mobility Command and the wing was redesignated the 317th Operations Group as part of the new 23d Composite Wing (23d Wing) at Pope. On 1 June 1992 the 317th OG was inactivated. As part of the inactivation, its operational squadrons were dissolved as follows:

- 39th Airlift Squadron – Activated 1 October 1993 with the 7th Wing, Dyess AFB, Texas
  Replaced at Pope by the 2d Airlift Squadron assigned to the 23d Composite Wing (23d Wing)
- 40th Airlift Squadron – Activated 1 October 1993 with the 7th Wing, Dyess AFB, Texas
- 41st Airlift Squadron – Reassigned to the 23d Composite Wing (23d Wing)

=== 23rd Wing ===
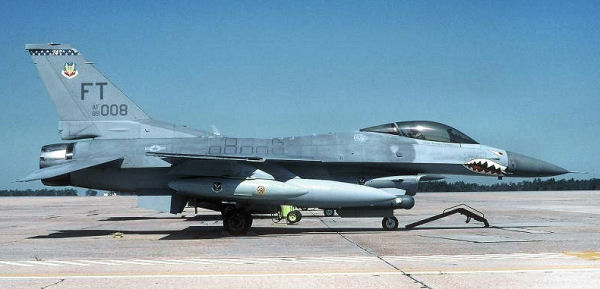
"Flying Tiger" General Dynamics F-16C Block 40E Fighting Falcon Serial 89-2008 of the 74th Fighter Squadron.

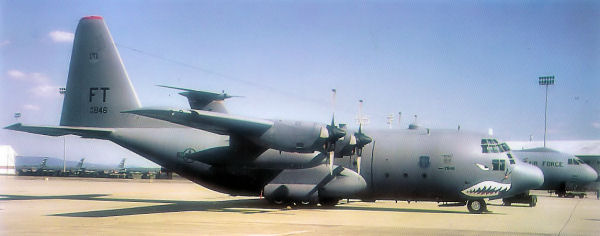
"Flying Tiger" Lockheed C-130E-LM Hercules Serial 63-7846 of the 41st Airlift Squadron.

Lessons learned in the Gulf War in 1990–1991 led senior defense planners to conclude that the structure of the military establishment created numerous command and control problems. Senior planners reviewed numerous options before agreeing on the final conclusion – a merger of most strategic and tactical air resources and the transfer of the tactical airlift squadrons out of the Military Airlift Command due to their combat orientation. In addition, the number of Air Force wings was to be reduced by about one-third to reflect the financial constraints of the post Cold War environment.

These changes led to Pope Air Force Base being transferred to the new Air Combat Command upon its activation on 1 June 1992. Also, the 317th TAW was blended into the new 23rd Wing on 1 June 1992 when the 23rd Fighter Wing at England Air Force Base, Louisiana was transferred to Pope after England's Base Realignment and Closure (BRAC) 1991 closing.

In April 1992, A/OA-10 Thunderbolt II aircraft were transferred to the 75th Fighter Squadron from the 353d FS / 354th FW at Myrtle Beach Air Force Base, South Carolina prior to the wing's inactivation and the base's closure in January 1993. In June 1993, Block 40 F-16C/Ds were transferred to the 74th Fighter Squadron from the 347th FW at Moody and 388th FW at Hill.

Operational squadrons of the 23rd Wing at Pope were:

- 317th Group
  - 2nd Airlift Squadron (C-130E) (1 June 1992 – 1 April 1997)
  - 41st Airlift Squadron (C-130E) (16 July 1993 – 1 April 1997)
- 23rd Group
  - 74th Tactical Fighter Squadron (15 June 1993 – 1 April 1997)
    (F-16C/D 15 June 1993 – 30 June 1996), (A/OA-10A 1 July 1996 – 1 April 1997) Ed Dooley was the first A-10 crew chief DCC for the 74th Fighter Squadron.
  - 75th Tactical Fighter Squadron (1 April 1992 – 1 April 1997) (A/OA-10A)

In December 1992, C-130s from the 2nd Airlift Squadron deployed to Mombasa, Kenya, to participate in Operation PROVIDE RELIEF. The aircraft and crews delivered tons of food and other relief supplies to small airstrips throughout Somalia. 23rd Wing Flying Tiger C-130s were also tasked to assist in other humanitarian relief efforts, to include Hurricane Andrew in Florida. They also airdropped relief supplies into Bosnia and Herzegovina and flew relief missions into Sarajevo for more than 28 months.

On 23 March 1994, two 23rd Wing aircraft, an F-16 and a C-130, collided in the base's landing pattern. After the two crewmembers of the F-16 ejected from their damaged fighter, the unmanned aircraft crashed into an aircraft parking ramp and hit a C-141 transport aircraft parked on the ramp. The resulting fireball and flaming wreckage killed 24 United States Army paratroopers who were waiting nearby to load the transports and injured almost 100 more paratroopers in what is known as the Green Ramp disaster.

In May 1994, the deployed 41st Airlift Squadron led the evacuation, known as Operation Tiger Rescue, of U.S. personnel from Yemen.

In September 1994, 23rd Wing Flying Tiger C-130s participated in what was to be the largest combat personnel drop since World War II, Operation UPHOLD DEMOCRACY. They were to assist in dropping more than 3,000 paratroopers from the 82d Airborne Division onto Port au Prince Airport, Haiti. The invasion force was recalled at the last minute after word that the Haitian president had resigned upon hearing that the aircraft were on their way. The 75th Fighter Squadron's A-10s were also involved in UPHOLD DEMOCRACY. The squadron deployed their aircraft to Shaw AFB, South Carolina, where they were scheduled to launch close air support operations for the invasion force before recovering in Puerto Rico.

The first operational deployment of a composite wing happened in October 1994, when Iraqi troops began massing near the Kuwaiti Border. Within 72 hours, 56 aircraft and 1,500 people deployed to the Persian Gulf region for Operation VIGILANT WARRIOR. Eventually, the 75th Fighter Squadron redeployed to Ahmad al-Jaber Air Base, Kuwait, becoming the first U.S. fixed-wing aircraft to be stationed in that country since the end of the Gulf War.

On 1 July 1996, the 74th Fighter Squadron's F-16C/D Fighting Falcons were transferred to the 27FW / 524th FS at Cannon AFB New Mexico, and the squadron transitioned to A/OA-10 Thunderbolt IIs received from the 20FW / 55th FS at Shaw AFB South Carolina. This gave the 23rd Wing a 2nd A-10 squadron.

The 23rd Wing won its fifth Air Force Outstanding Unit Award for the period of 31 May 1995 through 31 March 1997.

=== 43d Airlift Wing ===
On 1 April 1997, the 23rd Wing was inactivated and the C-130s and Pope Air Force Base were realigned to Air Mobility Command under the 43d Airlift Wing designation. The 43d Airlift Wing was designated as the host installation command.

On the same day, the 23rd Fighter Group was activated at Pope Air Force Base as a tenant unit aligned under the 4th Fighter Wing at Seymour Johnson Air Force Base, NC remaining in Air Combat Command. The 74th Fighter Squadron, 75th Fighter Squadron, 23rd Operations Support Squadron, and the 23rd Maintenance Squadron remained part of the group. Several of these planes provided the missing-man formation at the conclusion of the National Anthem at Super Bowl XXXII at Qualcomm Stadium in San Diego on 25 January 1998.

The 43d Airlift Wing performed en route operations support at Pope Field to include mission command & control, aircrew management, aircraft maintenance, aircraft loading, aircraft fueling and supply. The wing provided strategic, en-route airlift support and Lockheed C-130 Hercules tactical airlift support to the Army's XVIII Airborne Corps and 82nd Airborne Division. The wing traces its roots back to the 43rd Bombardment Group (Heavy), which was constituted 20 November 1940, and activated 15 January 1941, at Langley Field, VA. It operated primarily in the Southwest Pacific Theater as a Boeing B-17 Flying Fortress, and later a Consolidated B-24 Liberator heavy-bomber unit assigned to Fifth Air Force. The 43rd Operations Group carries the lineage and history of its highly decorated World War II predecessor unit.

=== 440th Airlift Wing ===
BRAC 2005 determined that the Air Force Reserve Command's 440th Airlift Wing and its C-130 aircraft were to be moved from Mitchell Field, Wisconsin to Pope. The wing started operations at Pope in 2006 and completed the move by October 2007. The first unit assembly at the new location was 1 October 2007. BRAC also made the 440th Airlift Wing the first active associate unit in Air Force history. The Regular Air Force's 2d Airlift Squadron and elements of the 43d Airlift Wing's maintenance units, that were also based at Pope, were receiving operational direction from the 440th while flying and helping maintain the C-130H2 Hercules Air Force Reserve aircraft. At the start of 2010, the 440th Airlift Wing had 16 C-130H models supporting worldwide missions and providing training missions for the XVIII Airborne Corps and 82nd Airborne Division from Fort Bragg.

The 440th was a United States Air Force Reserve unit that performed airfield operations to include airfield management, weather forecasting, airfield tower control, airfield navigation and landing systems' maintenance. The 440 AW's 95th Airlift Squadron shared the airlift mission with the 43d's 2d Airlift Squadron. The 440th also had the 36th Aeromedical Evacuation Squadron assigned which shared the AE mission with the 43d Aeromedical Evacuation Squadron.

Despite opposition from North Carolina congressmen and senators, the 440th Airlift Wing was inactivated as an Air Force cost savings measure. An article in the 6 March 2014 issue of the Fayetteville Observer noted that the Air Force has proposed the wing's inactivation and the retirement of its 12 C-130H aircraft. A follow-up article in the 11 March edition stated that state congressmen (Ellmers, Hudson, Price, and McIntyre) had spoken out against the proposed inactivation.

The last C-130 assigned to the 440th Airlift Wing departed on 29 June 2016, and the unit inactivated on 18 September 2016.

=== Merger with Fort Bragg ===
In the 2005 Base Realignment and Closure Plan, the Department of Defense started its plan to realign Pope AFB, NC. The Commission called for moving the 23rd Fighter Group's 36 A-10 Thunderbolt II (Warthogs) to Moody AFB, Georgia and the 43rd Airlift Wing's 25 C-130E's to Little Rock AFB, Arkansas; established a Medical Squadron; activated an Air Force Group to provide mission execution, planning, and management of efficient load-out of Fort Bragg assets; and transferred Real Property accountability to the Army. The 2005 BRAC Law directed that the mandates be completed no later than 15 September 2011.

The 23rd Fighter Group rejoined the 23rd Wing in a ceremony held on 18 August 2006 at Pope. On 19 December 2007, the last three of the A-10 Thunderbolt II aircraft left for Moody AFB.

On 1 March 2011, Pope Air Force Base was absorbed into Fort Bragg, becoming Pope Field.

=== Runway and airfield lighting system replacement ===
In 2019, degradation of Pope Field's runway and lighting system, many components of which were over 60 years old, became a major concern. From the fall of 2019 through spring of 2021, a major planning effort was undertaken to completely replace the runway and lighting system while continuing operations of units that rely on Pope Field at other locations. The runway was closed on 15 June 2021 to begin the $90 million construction. The project was completed ahead of schedule in approximately four months, opening on 14 October 2021 with the landing of a USAF C-17 Globemaster III crewed by elements of the 437th Airlift Wing (Joint Base Charleston, SC), and the 43d AMOG.

=== Inactivation of the 43d Air Base Squadron ===
On 8 July 2022, the 43d AMOG held a ceremony where it inactivated the 43d Air Base Squadron and activated both the 43d Force Support Squadron and the 43d Communications Squadron in its place.

== Role and operations ==
The United States Army Fort Bragg Garrison is the host organization at Pope Field. The garrison provides airfield support, security, and protection to include emergency medical and fire response, aircraft security, and transient alert support. It also provides installation support and is responsible to execute the Inter-Service Support Agreement in providing support to United States Air Force (USAF) tenants to include services, facility maintenance, and morale, welfare and recreation support.

The United States Air Force 43d Airlift Group was activated at Pope on 1 March 2011, and later redesignated the 43d Air Mobility Operations Group (AMOG) in 2016. The unit performs en route operations support to include mission command and control, aircrew management, aircraft maintenance, aircraft loading, aircraft fueling and supply, air traffic control, and aircraft landing systems maintenance. Furthermore, the 43 AMOG coordinates and supports joint training exercises for Fort Bragg's XVIII Airborne Corps and 82nd Airborne Division. Finally, the 43 AMOG is the lead Air Force unit responsible for rapid deployment coordination of the 82nd Airborne Division's Immediate Response Force (IRF).

In addition, the USAF 18th Air Support Operations Group, 427th Special Operations Squadron, 21st Special Tactics Squadron, 24th Special Tactics Squadron, and Air Force Combat Control School operate from Pope Field.

== Based units ==
Flying and notable non-flying units based at Pope Field.

Units marked GSU are Geographically Separate Units, which although based at Pope, are subordinate to a parent unit based at another location.

=== United States Air Force ===
Air Mobility Command

- US Air Force Expeditionary Center
  - 43rd Air Mobility Operations Group (GSU)
    - Headquarters 43rd Air Mobility Operations Group
    - 43rd Force Support Squadron
    - 43rd Communications Squadron
    - 43rd Air Mobility Squadron
    - 43rd Comptroller Squadron
    - 43rd Medical Squadron
    - 43rd Operations Support Squadron

Air Combat Command

- Ninth Air Force
  - 93rd Air Ground Operations Wing
    - 18th Air Support Operations Group (GSU)
      - 14th Air Support Operations Squadron
      - 682nd Air Support Operations Squadron

Air Force Special Operations Command

- 24th Special Operations Wing
  - 720th Special Tactics Group
    - 21st Special Tactics Squadron (GSU)
  - 724th Special Tactics Group (GSU)
    - 24th Special Tactics Squadron
    - 724th Intelligence Squadron
    - 724th Operations Support Squadron
    - 724th Special Tactics Support Squadron
  - 352nd Special Warfare Training Squadron / Combat Control School (GSU)
- 427th Special Operations Squadron – various STOL aircraft

== Education ==
Dependent children on post are assigned to schools in the Department of Defense Education Activity (DoDEA). Albritton Middle School took students from Pope Field.

High school students are zoned to the district public schools of the counties they reside in. Pope AFB's high school district would be Cumberland County Schools.

== See also ==
- List of United States Air Force installations
- List of United States Army airfields
- North Carolina World War II Army Airfields

== Other sources ==
- This article incorporates public domain material from the Air Force Historical Research Agency
- Endicott, Judy G., ed. (2001). The USAF in Korea, Campaigns, Units and Stations 1950-1953 (PDF). Maxwell AFB, AL: Air Force Historical Research Agency. ISBN 0-16-050901-7. Archived (PDF) from the original on 20 December 2016.
- Mueller, Robert (1989). Air Force Bases, Vol. I, Active Air Force Bases Within the United States of America on 17 September 1982 (PDF). Washington, DC: Office of Air Force History. ISBN 0-912799-53-6. Archived (PDF) from the original on 20 December 2016.
- Martin, Patrick (1994). Tail Code: The Complete History of USAF Tactical Aircraft Tail Code Markings. Schiffer Military Aviation History. ISBN 0-88740-513-4.
- Ravenstein, Charles A (1984). Air Force Combat Wings', Lineage & Honors Histories 1947-1977. Washington, DC: Office of Air Force History. ISBN 0-912799-12-9.
- Rogers, Brian (2005). United States Air Force Unit Designations Since 1978. Hinkley, England: Midland Publications. ISBN 1-85780-197-0.
- USAAS-USAAC-USAAF-USAF Aircraft Serial Numbers–1908 to present Archived 30 January 2009 at the Wayback Machine
