= Calidus B-250 =

Emirati/Brazilian military trainer aircraft

B-250
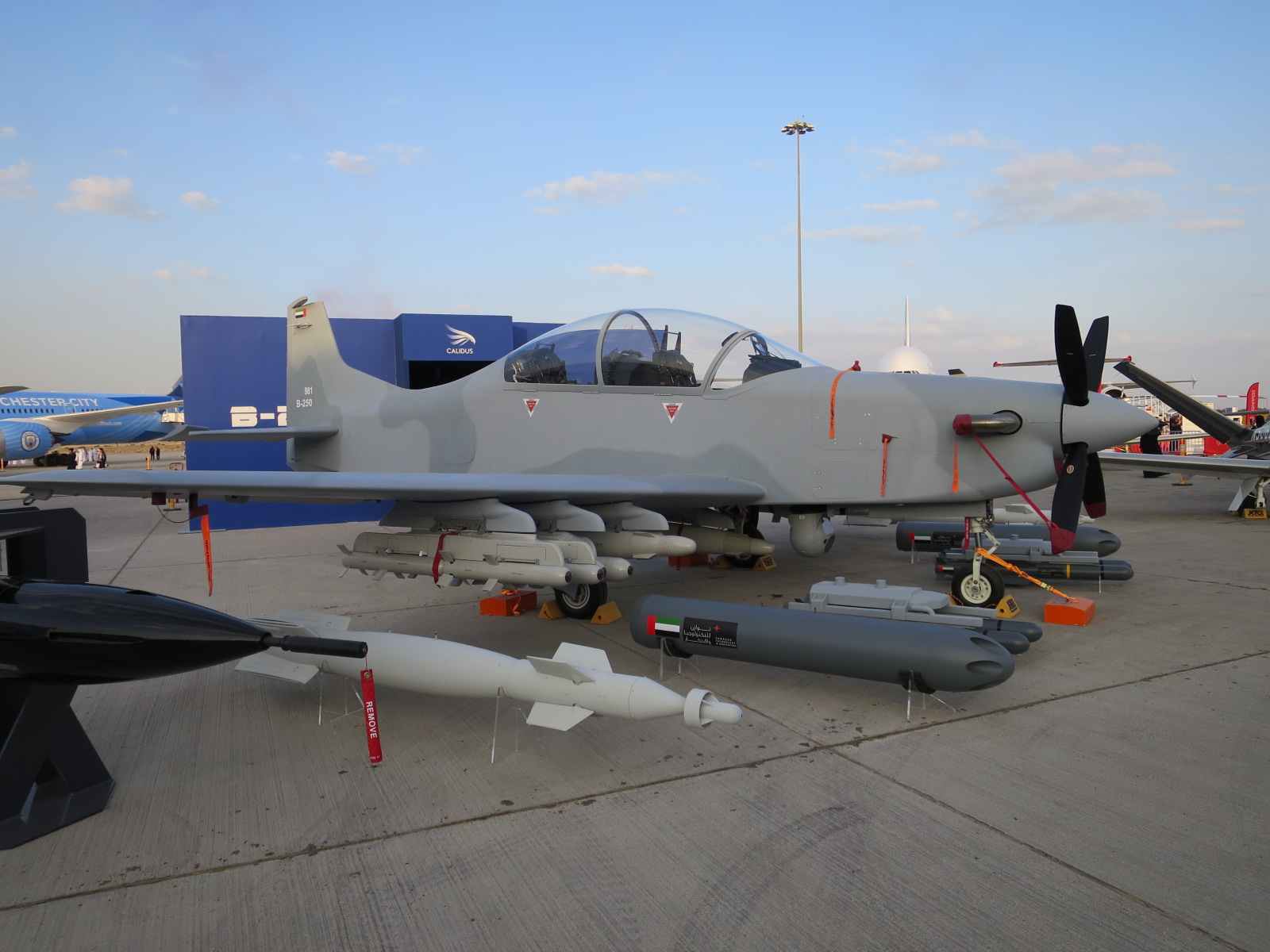
- Calidus B-250 at Dubai Air Show 2019

General information
- Type: Military trainer Light attack aircraft
- National origin: United Arab Emirates / Brazil
- Manufacturer: Calidus
- Designer: Novaer
- Status: In production
- Primary user: United Arab Emirates Air Force
- Number built: 2 (as of January 2018)

History
- First flight: July 2017

The Calidus B-250 is a tandem-seat, turboprop, light attack aircraft with counter-insurgency capability. Its structure is constructed entirely of carbon fiber, thus making it much lighter than its competitors. It has 7 hard points for placing weapons as well as EO/IR. It has Pro Line Fusion II avionics systems supplied by the American company Rockwell Collins.

== Design and development ==
The B-250 is a low-wing cantilever monoplane with a retractable tricycle landing gear. It has an enclosed cockpit with two Martin-Baker ejection seats in tandem. It has a single Pratt & Whitney Canada PT-6A-68 turboprop in tractor configuration. It was designed and developed in Brazil by Novaer, with mass production to be undertaken by Calidus in the United Arab Emirates. The chief designer for the project was Joseph Kovács who created the Embraer Tucano.

In 2019, 24 aircraft were ordered by the United Arab Emirates Air Force at the 2019 Dubai Airshow.

Intelligence Online revealed that Calidus and Indonesia were working to transform the B-250 aircraft into a state-of-the-art combat drone. The project was discussed with Mohammed bin Zayed Al Nahyan by Prabowo Subianto, during his visit to Abu Dhabi in May 2024. Avionics, surveillance and weapons from both nations were to be used for the new drone. Some Indonesia-made components were also to be used to facilitate the drone’s production in Jakarta. Intelligence Online said the drone plane could also be equipped with AI Tariq and Thunder (formerly P3) missiles developed by the EDGE Group.

== Operators ==
United Arab Emirates

- United Arab Emirates Air Force

== Specifications ==
Data from Air International

General characteristics

- Crew: 2
- Length: 10.98 m (36 ft 0 in)
- Wingspan: 12.09 m (39 ft 8 in)
- Height: 3.79 m (12 ft 5 in)
- Powerplant: 1 × Pratt & Whitney Canada PT6A-68 turboprop, 1,200 kW (1,600 shp)

Performance

- Maximum speed: 557 km/h (346 mph, 301 kn)
- Cruise speed: 520 km/h (320 mph, 280 kn) (clean)
- Combat range: 560 km (350 mi, 300 nmi) (combat radius, 4x laser guided bombs, 2x Air-to-air missiles and 1x fuel tank)
- Ferry range: 2,400 km (1,500 mi, 1,300 nmi)
- Endurance: 12 hr
- Service ceiling: 9,100 m (30,000 ft)

Armament

- Hardpoints: 7 with a capacity of 1,800 kg (3,960 lb)

== See also ==
- Calidus B-350
- Embraer EMB 314 Super Tucano
- Novaer T-Xc
- Novaer U-Xc Stardream
