= De Havilland Canada DHC-4 Caribou =

De Havilland Canada transport aircraft

DHC-4 Caribou
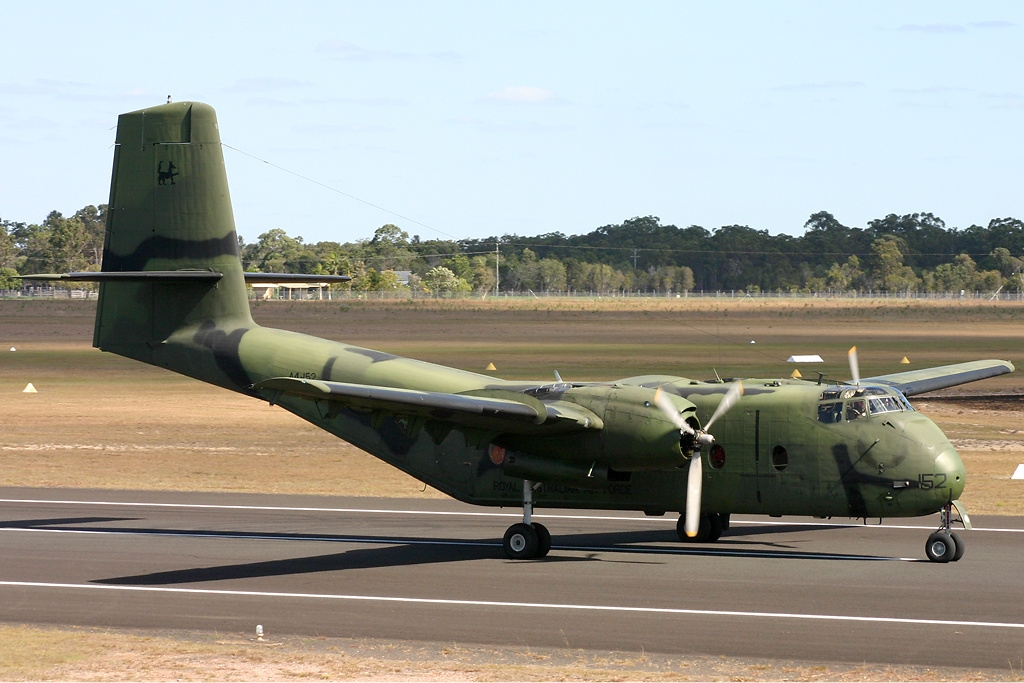
- A Royal Australian Air Force Caribou at Bundaberg Airport

General information
- Type: STOL transport aircraft
- National origin: Canada
- Manufacturer: de Havilland Canada
- Status: In limited service
- Primary users: Royal Canadian Air Force United States Army; United States Air Force; Royal Australian Air Force
- Number built: 307

History
- Manufactured: 1958–1968
- Introduction date: 1961
- First flight: 30 July 1958
- Retired: RAAF (2009)
- Developed into: de Havilland Canada DHC-5 Buffalo

The de Havilland Canada DHC-4 Caribou (designated by the United States military as the CV-2 and later C-7 Caribou) is a Canadian specialized cargo aircraft with short takeoff and landing (STOL) capability developed by de Havilland Canada. The Caribou was first flown in 1958 and although mainly retired from military operations, is still in use in small numbers as a rugged bush airplane. The type certificate of the aircraft is now owned by De Havilland Canada founded in 2019.

The design was further developed as the de Havilland Canada DHC-5 Buffalo, adding turboprop engines and other changes that further improved its short-field performance to the point where it competes with light aircraft even with a full load.

== Design and development ==
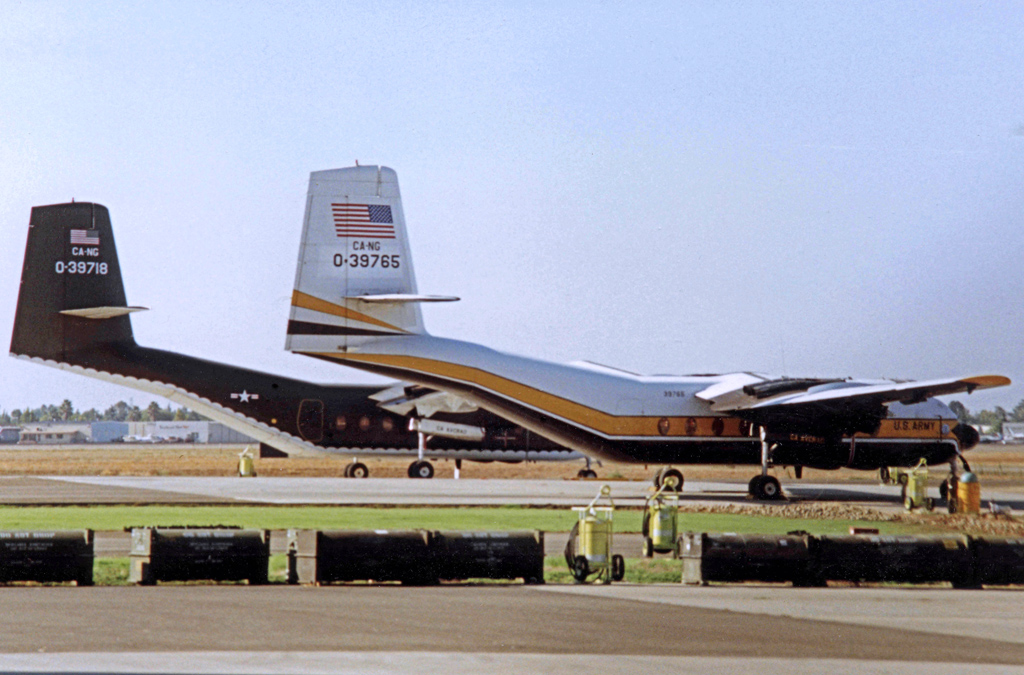
C-7B Caribou aircraft of the U.S. Army/California Army National Guard

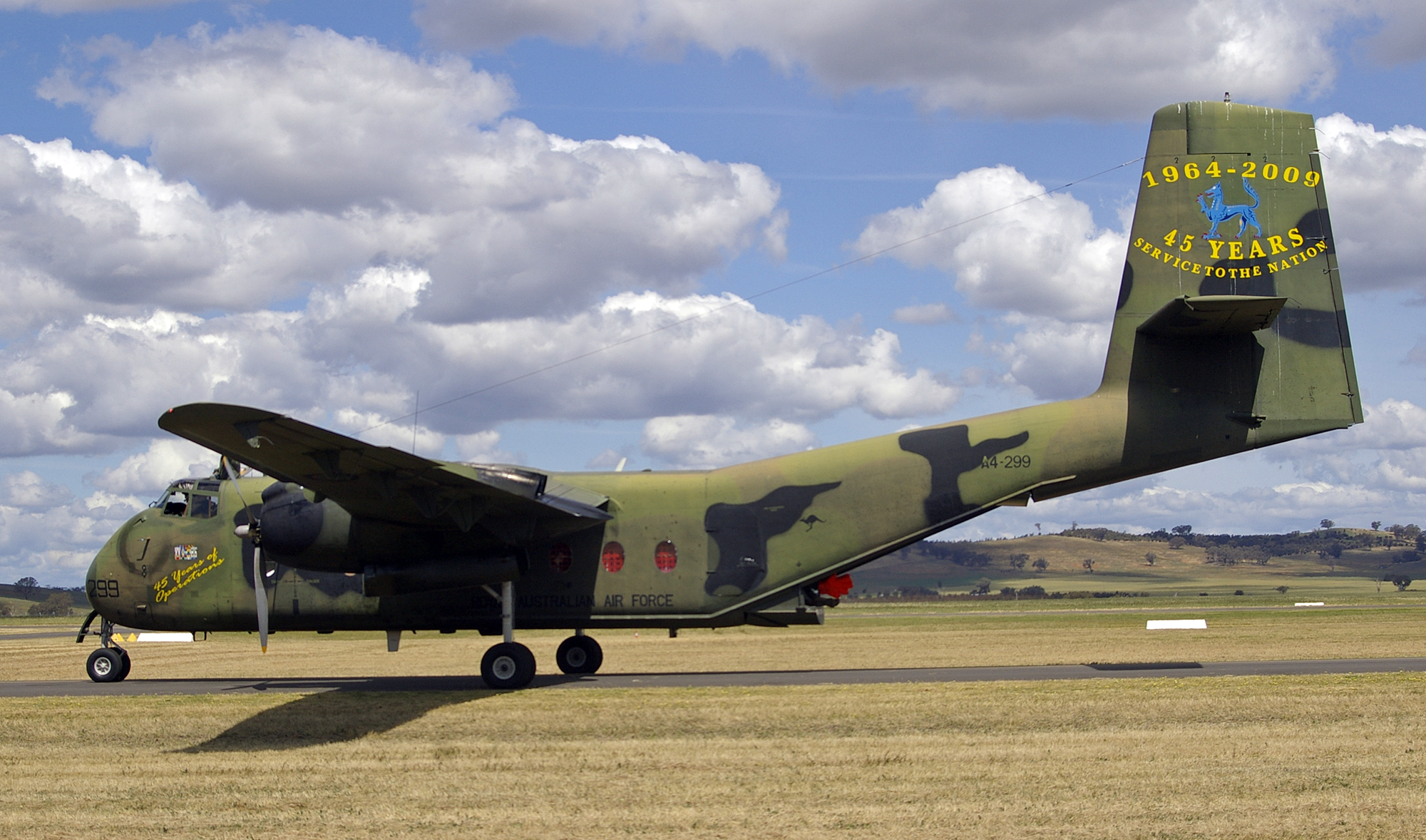
RAAF DHC-4 Caribou (A4-299) from No. 38 Squadron.

The de Havilland Canada (DHC) company's third short takeoff and landing (STOL) design was a big increase in size compared to its earlier DHC Beaver and DHC Otter, and was the first DHC design powered by two engines. The Caribou was similar in concept in that it was designed as a rugged STOL utility aircraft. The Caribou was primarily a military tactical transport that in commercial service found itself a small niche in cargo hauling. The United States Army ordered 173 in 1959 and took delivery in 1961 under the designation AC-1, which was changed to CV-2 Caribou in 1962.

The majority of Caribou production was destined for military operators, but the type's ruggedness and excellent STOL capabilities requiring runway lengths of only 1200 feet (365 metres) also appealed to some commercial users. U.S. certification was awarded on 23 December 1960. Ansett-MAL, which operated a single example in the New Guinea highlands, and Amoco Ecuador were early customers, as was Air America (a CIA front in South East Asia during the Vietnam War era for covert operations). Other civil Caribou aircraft entered commercial service after being retired from their military users.

== Operational history ==
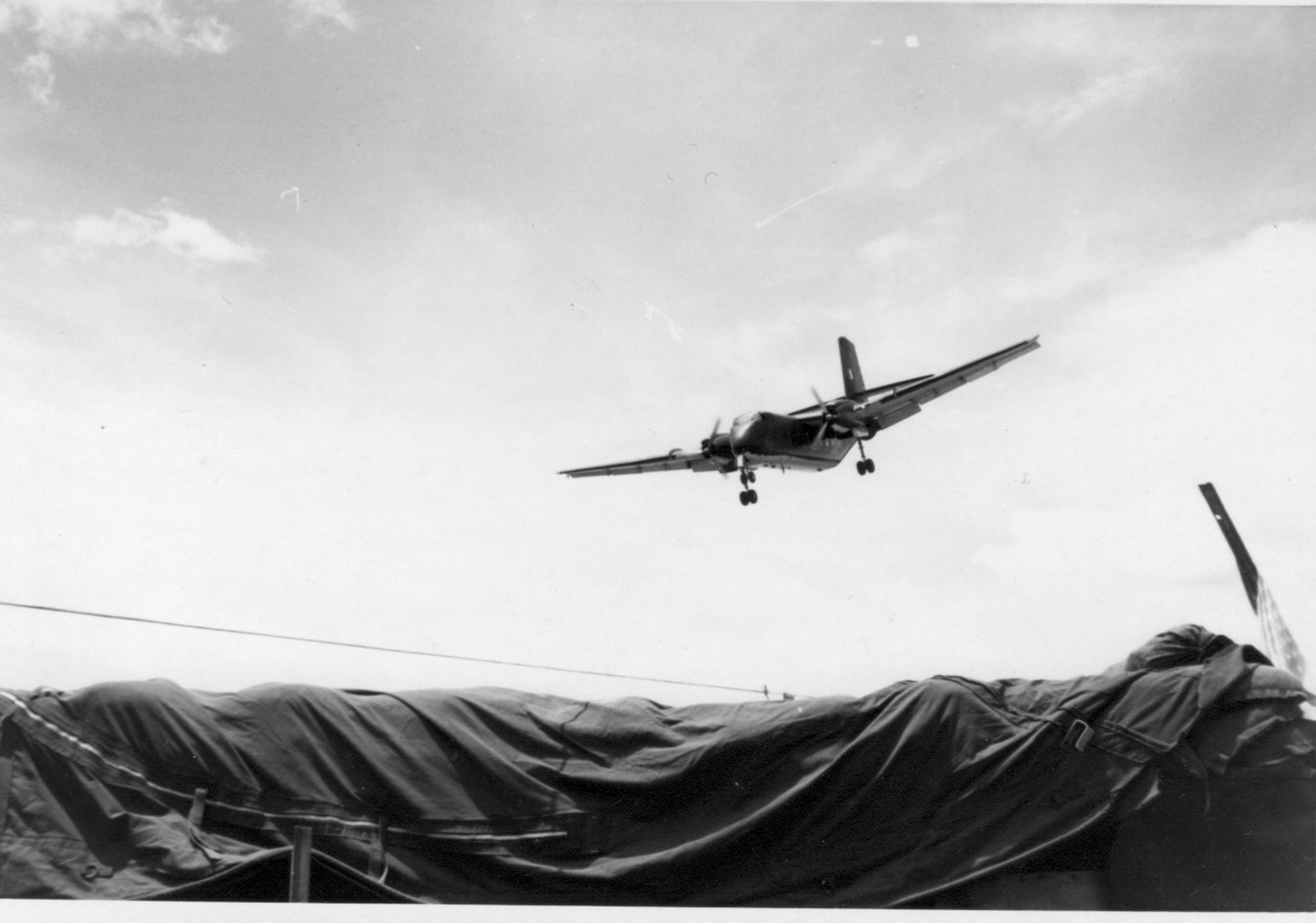
A Royal Australian Air Force Caribou transport aircraft on landing approach, Vietnam War

In response to a United States Army requirement for a tactical airlifter to supply the battlefront with troops and supplies and evacuate casualties on the return journey, de Havilland Canada designed the DHC-4. With assistance from Canada's Department of Defence Production, DHC built a prototype demonstrator that flew for the first time on 30 July 1958.

Impressed with the DHC4's STOL capabilities and potential, the U.S. Army ordered five for evaluation as YAC-1s and went on to become the largest Caribou operator. The AC-1 designation was changed in 1962 to CV-2, and then C-7 when the U.S. Army's CV-2s were transferred to the U.S. Air Force in 1967. U.S. and Australian Caribou saw extensive service during the Vietnam War.

The U.S. Army purchased 159 of the aircraft and they served their purpose well as a tactical transport during the Vietnam War, where larger cargo aircraft such as the Fairchild C-123 Provider and the Lockheed C-130 Hercules could not land on the shorter landing strips. The aircraft could carry 32 troops or two Jeeps or similar light vehicles. The rear loading ramp could also be used for parachute dropping (also, see Air America).

Under the Johnson-McConnell agreement of 1966, the Army relinquished the fixed wing Caribou to the United States Air Force in exchange for an end to restrictions on Army rotary wing operations. On 1 January 1967, the 17th, 57th, 61st Aviation Companies (12th Combat Aviation Group) and the 92nd, 134th, and 135th Aviation Companies of the U.S. Army were inactivated and their aircraft transferred respectively to the newly activated 537th, 535th, 536th, 459th, 457th, and 458th Troop Carrier Squadrons of the USAF (This was Operation "Red Leaf"). On 1 August 1967 the "troop carrier" designations were changed to "tactical airlift".

Some Republic of Vietnam Air Force Caribou were captured by North Vietnamese forces in 1975 and remained in service with that country through to the late 1970s. Following the war in Vietnam, all USAF Caribou were transferred to Air Force Reserve and Air National Guard airlift units pending their replacement by the C-130 Hercules in the 1980s.

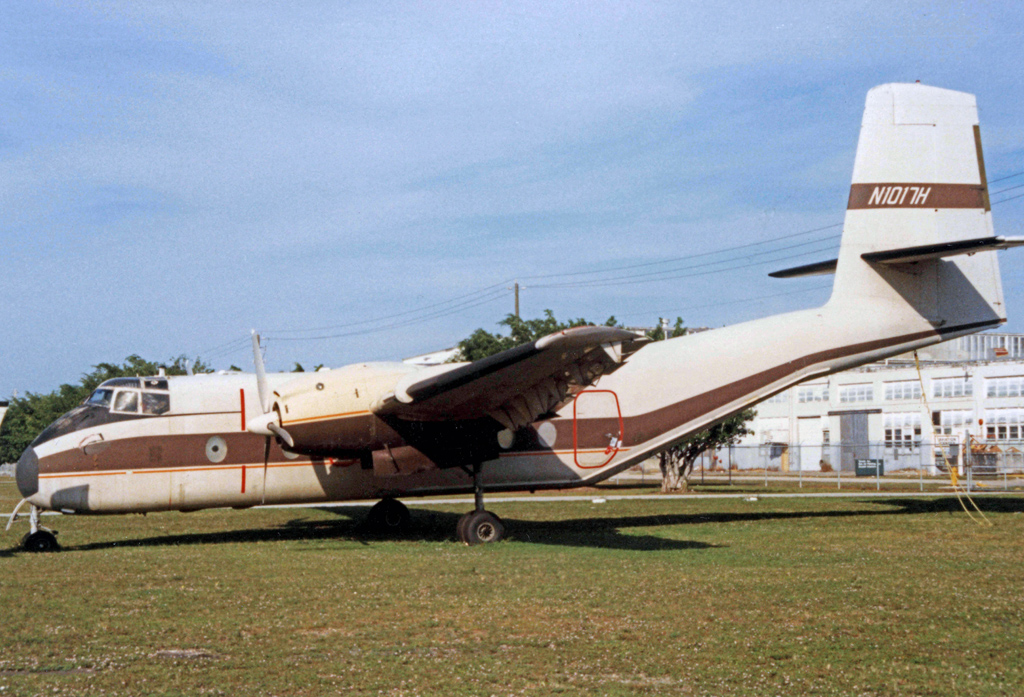
Ex U.S. Army CV-2A, operated by Chieftain Aviation, at Opa-locka Airport near Miami in 1989

All C-7s have now been phased out of U.S. military service, with the last example serving again under U.S. Army control through 1985 in support of the U.S. Army's Golden Knights parachute demonstration team. Other notable military operators included Australia, Canada, India, Malaysia and Spain.

In September 1975, a group of 44 civilians, including armed supporters of the Timorese Democratic Union (UDT), commandeered a Royal Australian Air Force (RAAF) Caribou, A4-140, on the ground at Baucau Airport in the then Portuguese Timor, which was in the middle of a civil war. The Caribou had landed at Baucau on a humanitarian mission for the International Committee of the Red Cross. The civilians demanded that the RAAF crew members fly them to Darwin Airport (also RAAF Base Darwin) in Australia, which they did. After the Caribou arrived there, the Australian government detained the civilians for a short period, and then granted refugee visas to all of them. The Guardian later described A4-140 as "the only RAAF plane ever hijacked", and the incident as "one of the more remarkable stories in Australia's military and immigration history".

The RAAF retired A4-140, by then its last Caribou, on 27 November 2009. The aircraft, which was manufactured in 1964, was donated to the Australian War Memorial, Canberra.

=== Civilian operations ===
One US Navy Caribou remained in service with the Golden Knights Parachute Team until the 1980s, at which point the aircraft transitioned into civilian use and cargo services.

After retirement from military use, several examples of the Caribou have been purchased by civilian operators for deployment in areas with small airfields located in rugged country with few or poor surface transport links.

== Variants ==
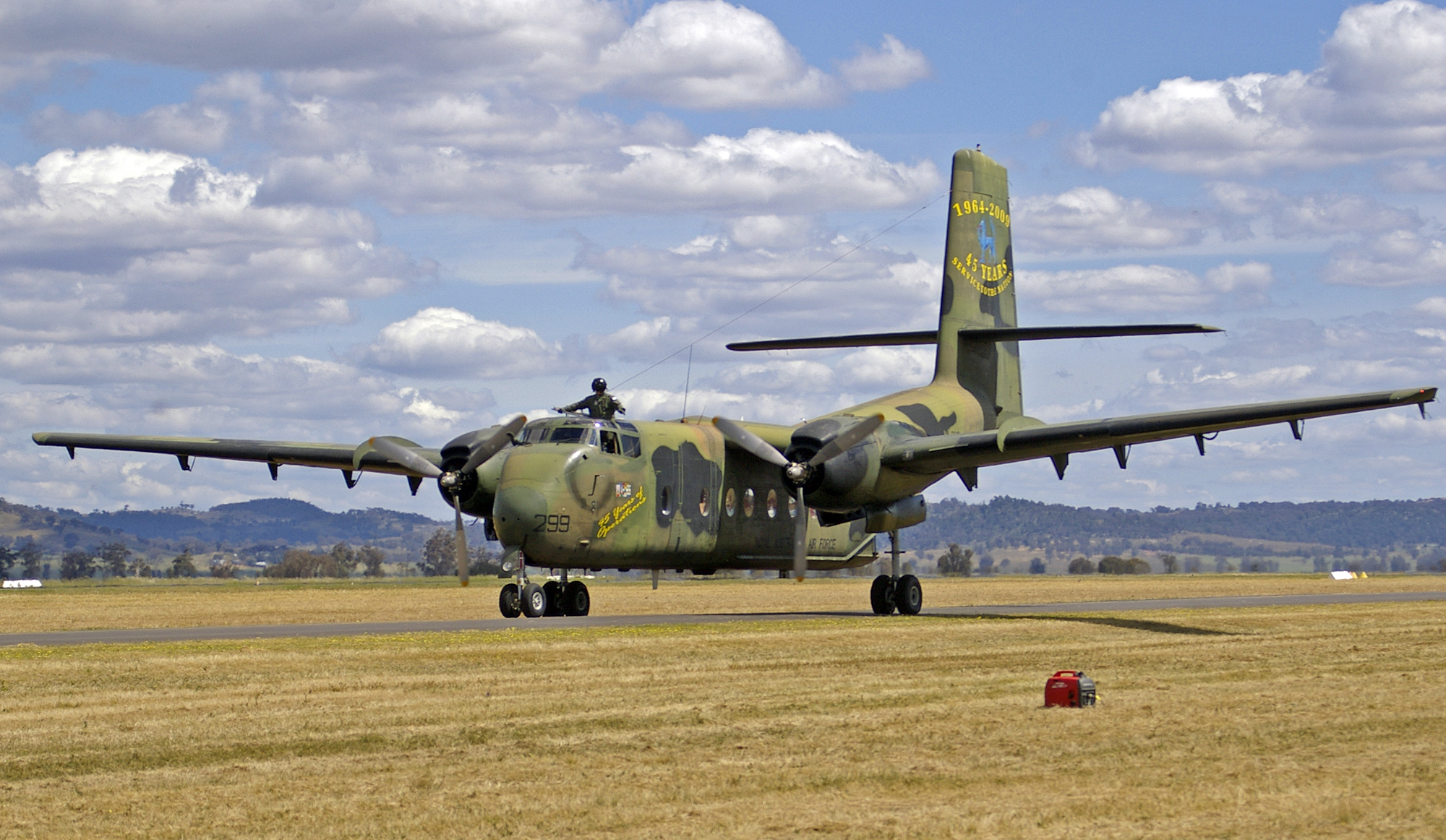
Royal Australian Air Force DHC-4

DHC-4 Caribou
STOL tactical transport, utility transport aircraft.

CC-108
Royal Canadian Air Force designation for the DHC-4 Caribou.
YAC-1
This designation was given to five DHC-4 Caribou, sold to the United States Army for evaluation.
AC-1
United States Army designation for the first production run of 56 DHC-4 Caribou. Later redesignated CV-2A in 1962.
CV-2A
United States Army AC-1 redesignated in 1962.

CV-2B

This designation was given to a second production run of 103 DHC-4 Caribou, which were sold to the U.S. Army, with reinforced internal ribbing.
C-7A/B
These designations were applied to all 144 Caribou transferred to the U.S. Air Force by the U.S. Army.

DHC-4A Caribou
Similar to the DHC-4, but this version had an increased takeoff weight.
DHC-4T Turbo Caribou
A conversion of the baseline DHC-4 Caribou powered by the PWC PT6A-67T turboprop engines designed, test flown and certified by the Pen Turbo Aviation company.

== Operators ==
=== Military operators ===
Abu Dhabi/ United Arab Emirates

- Abu Dhabi Defence Forces Air Wing – Abu Dhabi operated five Caribou.
- United Arab Emirates Air Force

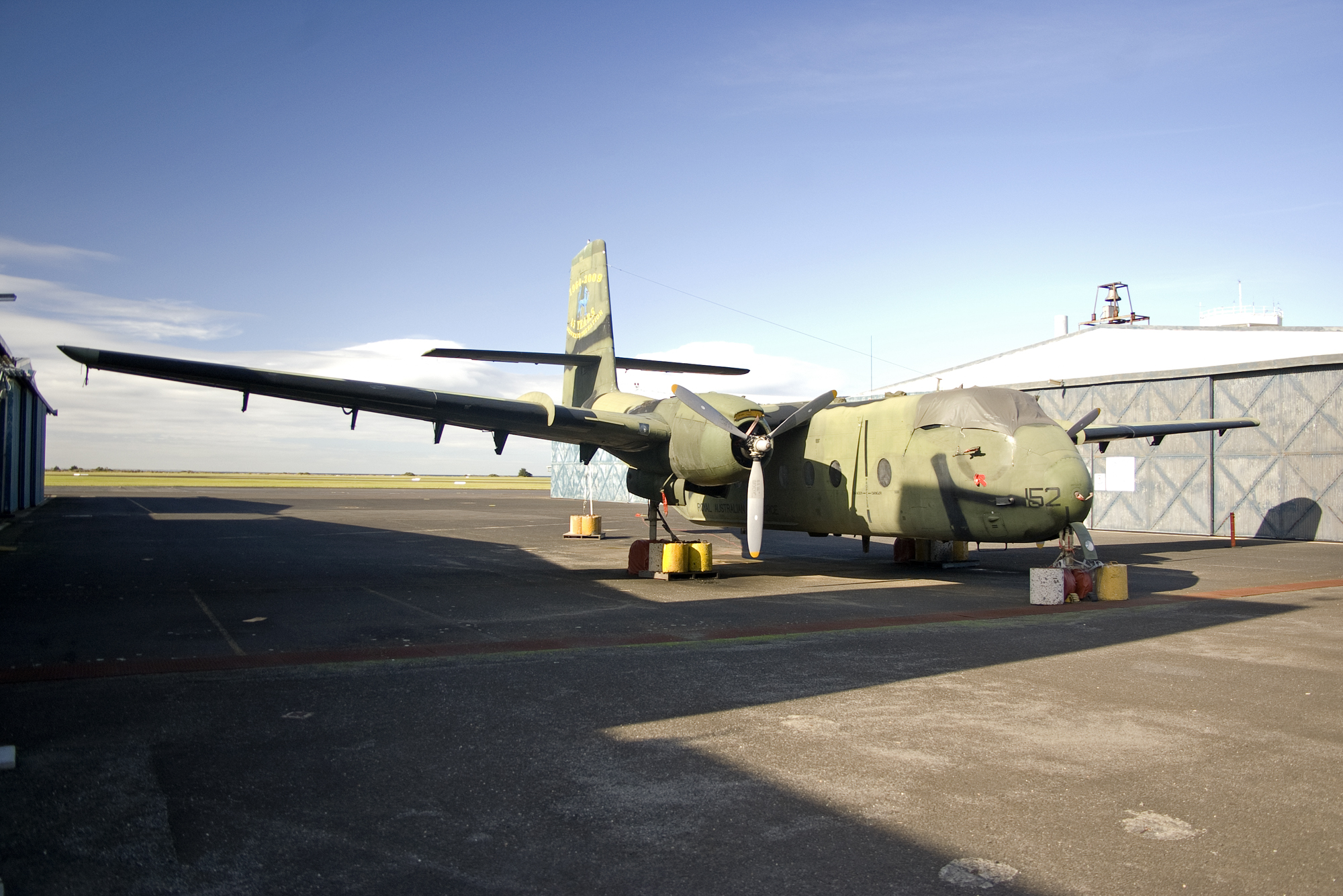
Caribou at the RAAF museum.

Australia

- Royal Australian Air Force – 18 ordered in 1963, with further orders for seven in 1964 and four more aircraft ordered individually between 1968 and 1971. Retired 2009.
  - RAAF Transport Flight Vietnam 1964–1966, redesignated as No. 35 Squadron - seven operated
  - No. 35 Squadron RAAF 1966–2000 – transferred to No 38 Squadron RAAF.
  - No. 38 Squadron RAAF 1964–2009 – all retired.

Canada

- Royal Canadian Air Force – nine delivered; retired from Canadian Forces in 1971.
  - 424 Transport and Rescue Squadron

Cameroon

- Cameroon Air Force – two delivered in 1971. The surviving Caribou was sold in 1987.

Costa Rica

- Air Surveillance Service – Two ex-USAF C-7As delivered in the 1980s. Refurbished in July 2010 for the Fuerza Publica.

Ghana

- Ghana Air Force – Ghana acquired eight new-build Caribou in 1963, which were operated until replaced by Fokker F.27-400Ms in 1975.

India

- Indian Air Force – India received 20 new build Caribou, supplementing them with four ex-Ghanaian Caribou in 1975.

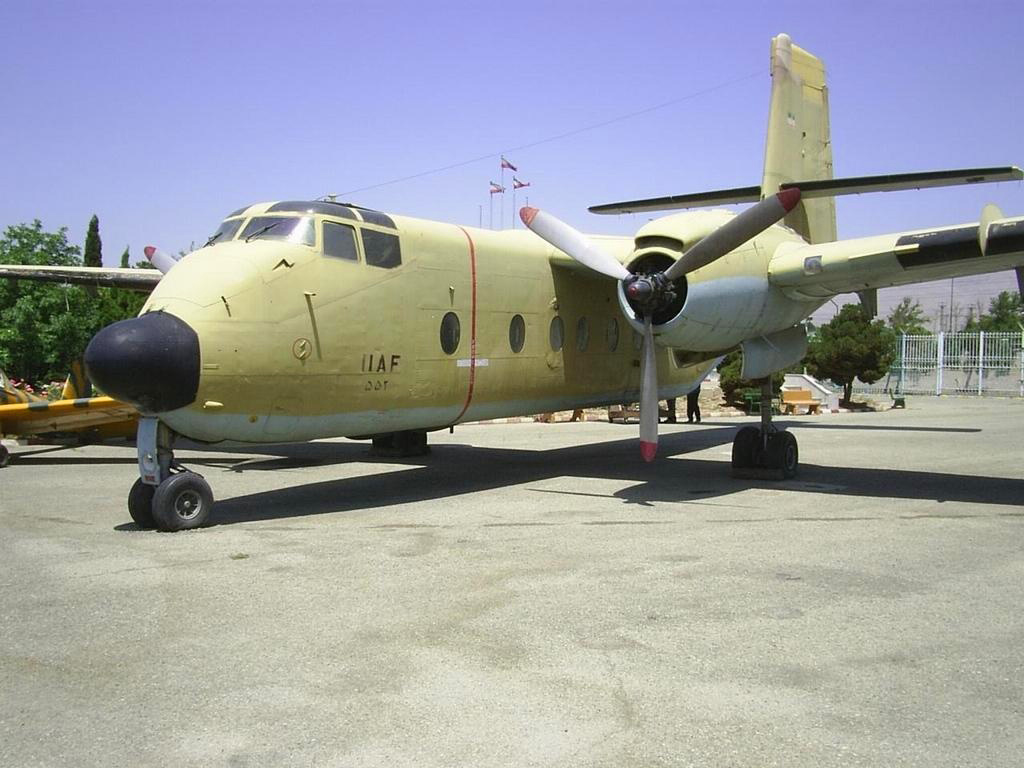
The only Iranian DHC-4 Caribou

Pahlavi Iran

- Imperial Iranian Air Force – One aircraft delivered to Iran. It was retired after Iran–Iraq War.

Kenya

- Kenya Air Force – received six DHC-4As, operating the type from 1966 to 1987.

Kuwait

- Kuwait Air Force – received two aircraft in 1963.

Liberia

- Liberian Army – Two refurbished aircraft were delivered to the Air Reconnaissance Unit in 1989. The aircraft were destroyed during the civil war.

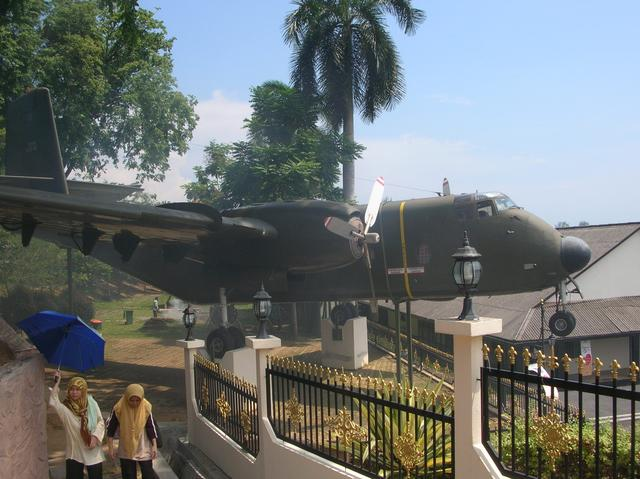
RMAF Caribou on display at the Malaysian Army Museum, Port Dickson.

Malaysia

- Royal Malaysian Air Force – retired their Caribou from active service.

Oman

- Sultanate of Oman Air Force

Spain

- Spanish Air Force – received 12 new Caribou later supplemented by 24 former United States Air Force C-7As. Final retirement 12 June 1991.

South Vietnam

- Republic of Vietnam Air Force - at least 55 transferred from USAF stocks and operated by:
  - 427th Transport Squadron
  - 429th Transport Squadron
  - 431st Transport Squadron

Sweden

- Swedish Air Force – operated one DHC-4 Caribou designated Tp 55 between 1962 and 1965 for evaluation purposes at Skaraborg Wing (F 7).

Tanzania

- Tanzanian Air Force

Thailand

- Royal Thai Police – used three DHC-4A from 1966 to 2005.

Uganda

- Uganda Police Force Air Wing

United States

- United States Army
- United States Air Force

Vietnam

- Vietnam People's Air Force – captured several ex-VNAF airplanes.

Zambia

- Zambian Air Force – operated four Caribou. Retired.

=== Civil operators ===
Australia

- Ansett-MAL – operated one aircraft in the New Guinea highlands.

Canada

- La Sarre Air Services
  - acquired C-GVGX in 1977 (delivered 1961) and unknown status after 1981 when Propair formed from merger of La Sarre Air Services (used in El Salvador to Nicaragua 1986)

Costa Rica

- Air Vigillance Service

Ecuador

- Amoco Ecuador
- Anglo-Ecuador Oilfields
- Aerolíneas Cóndor of SA

Gabon

- Air Inter Gabon

Indonesia

- Municipal Government of Puncak Regency
- Trigana Air

Malta

- New Cal Aviation

Papua New Guinea

- Garamut Exploration Services
- Vanimo Trading

Taiwan

- Air Asia

United States

- Air America
- Bannock Aerospace
- Chieftain Air
- Deutsche Aviation
- Environmental Research Institute of Michigan
- Fowler Aeronautical Service
- HAT Aviation
- John Woods Inc
- New Cal Aviation
- Pen Turbo Aviation
- Flightworks

== Aircraft on display ==
=== Australia ===
Airworthy

- A4-210 – DHC-4 airworthy with the Historical Aircraft Restoration Society, Shellharbour Airport, Albion Park, New South Wales. Now carries civil registration.
- A4-234 – DHC-4 airworthy with the Historical Aircraft Restoration Society, Shellharbour Airport, Albion Park, New South Wales. Now carries civil registration.

On display

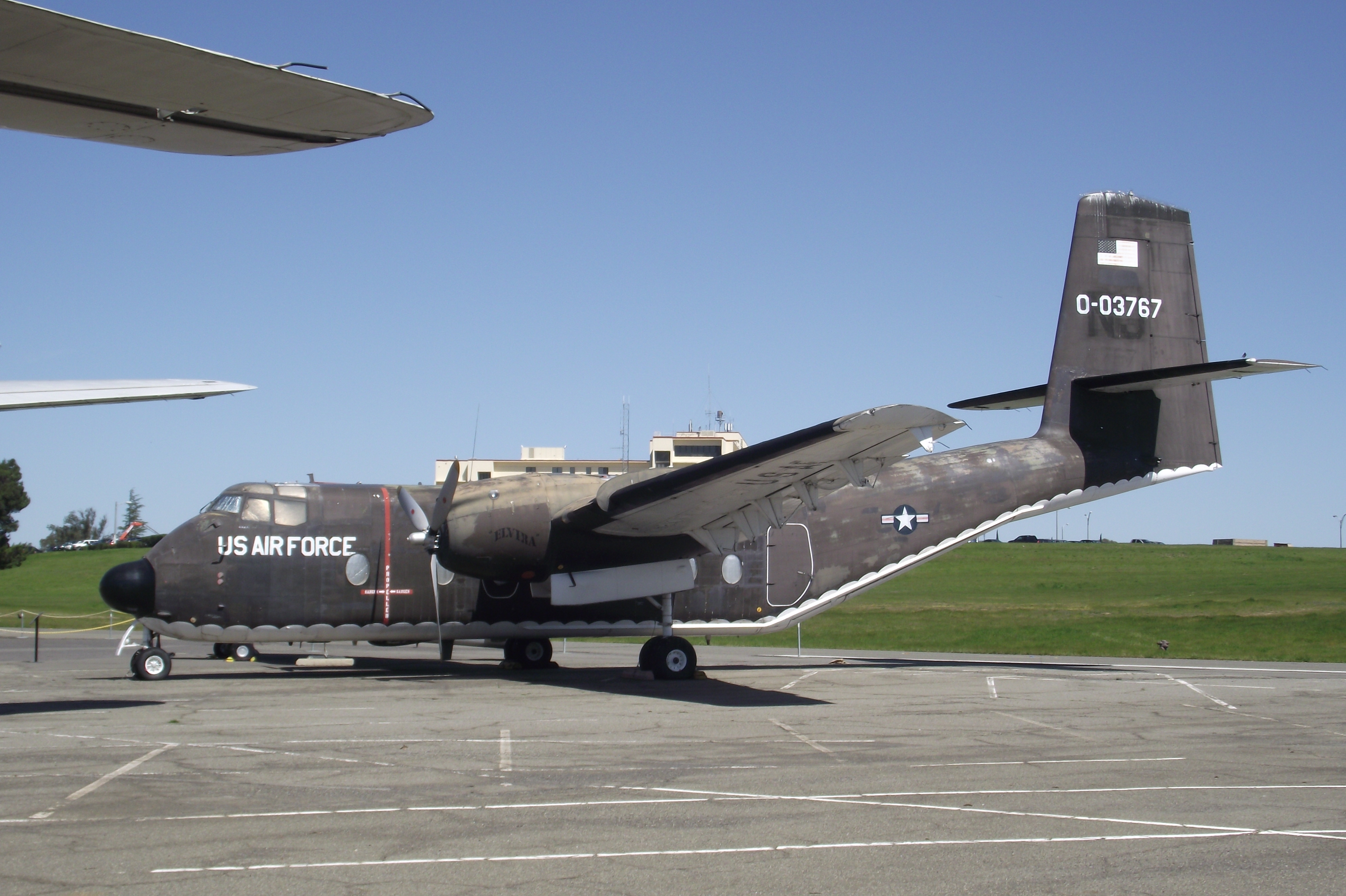
C-7A 60–3767 at Travis Air Force Base Heritage Center

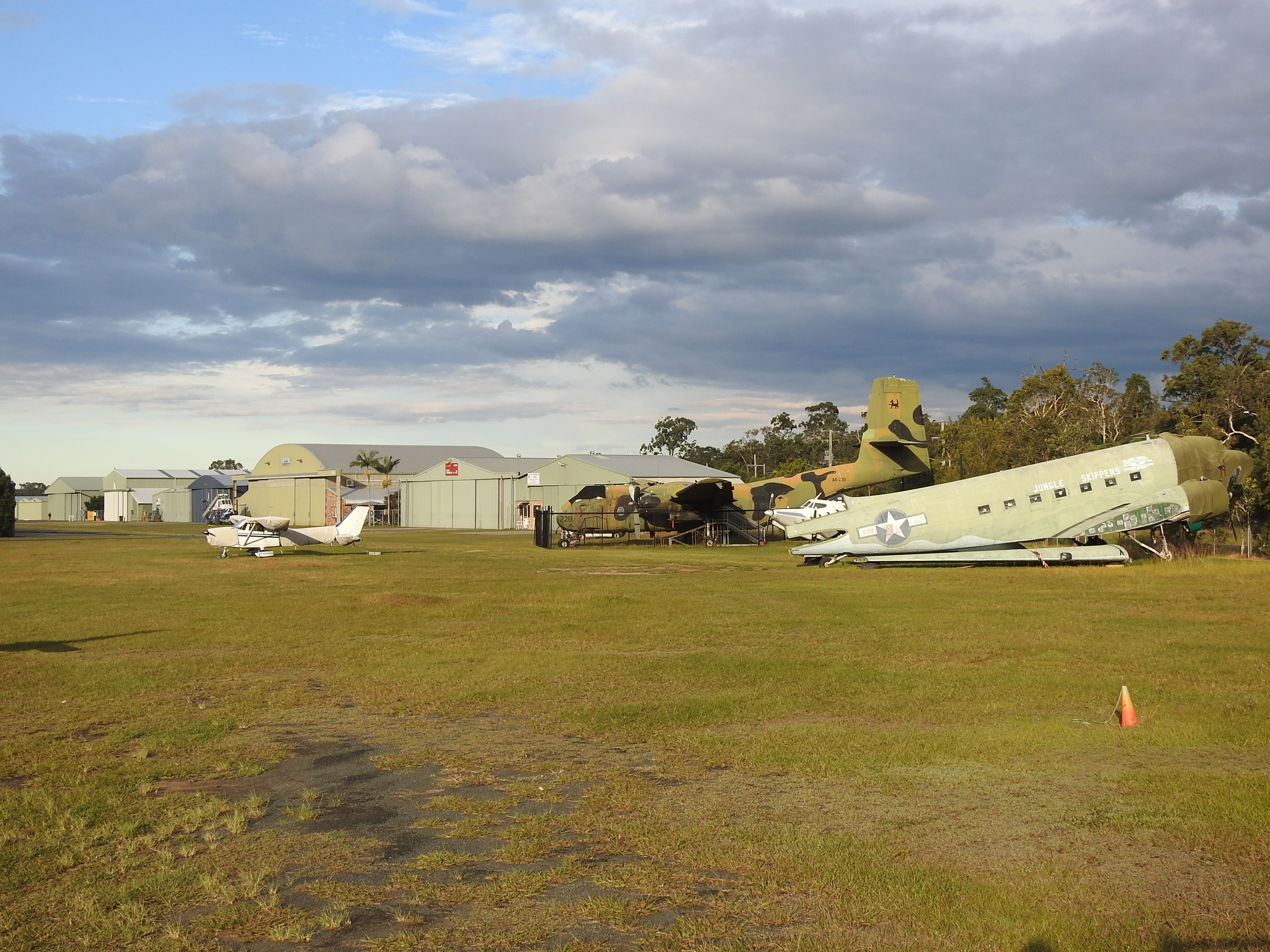
A4-228 at Caboolture (2021).

- A4-134 – DHC-4 on display at The Army Museum Bandiana, Bandiana, Victoria.
- A4-140 – DHC-4 in storage at the Treloar Technology Centre of the Australian War Memorial in Mitchell, Australian Capital Territory. This airframe was gifted to the museum in November 2009.
- A4-152 – DHC-4 on static display at the RAAF Museum in Point Cook, Victoria. This airframe was gifted to the museum in November 2009.
- A4-159 – DHC-4 forward section at the Queensland Air Museum in Caloundra, Queensland.
- A4-173 – DHC-4 on static display at the Queensland Air Museum in Caloundra, Queensland (fitted with the wings and tail off A4-164).
- A4-179 – DHC-4 fuselage on static display as part of a jungle-themed thrill-ride precinct at the Dreamworld theme park on the Gold Coast, Queensland.
- A4-195 – DHC-4 with the Australian Army Flying Museum in Oakey, Queensland.
- A4-199 – DHC-4 gate guard at RAAF Base Townsville in Townsville, Queensland
- A4-204 – DHC-4 on display at National Vietnam Veterans Museum, Phillip Island, Victoria
- A4-225 – DHC-4 on display at South Australian Aviation Museum, Port Adelaide, South Australia.
- A4-228 – DHC-4 on display at Caboolture Warplane and Flight Heritage Museum, Caboolture Airfield, Caboolture, Queensland.
- A4-231 – DHC-4 on display at National Vietnam Veterans Museum, Phillip Island, Victoria.
- A4-236 – DHC-4 on static display at the Aviation Heritage Center, RAAF Base Amberley, Queensland.
- A4-275 – DHC-4 on display at the Historical Aircraft Restoration Society, Parkes, New South Wales.
- A4-299 – DHC-4 on static display at Evans Head Memorial Aerodrome Heritage Aviation Association Museum at Evans Head, New South Wales.

=== Costa Rica ===
On display

- MSP002 - DHC-4 on static display at Daniel Oduber Quiros International Airport, Liberia, Costa Rica

=== India ===
On display

- BM769 – DHC-4 on static display at the Eastern Air Command Headquarters in Shillong, Meghalaya
- BM774 – DHC-4 on static display at the Indian Air Force Museum in Palam, Delhi.

=== Malaysia ===
On display

- M21-04 – DHC-4A on static display at the Royal Malaysian Air Force Museum in Sungai Besi, Kuala Lumpur.
- A ex-RMAF DHC-4A on static display at the Malaysian Army Museum at Port Dickson, Negeri Sembilan.
- M21-01 a ex-RMAF DHC-4A as an educational display near the Aeronautical Engineering Facilities at the Faculty of Mechanical Engineering in the University of Technology Malaysia at Skudai, Iskandar Puteri, Johor Bahru, Johor.

=== Spain ===
On display

- T.9-9 – DHC-4A on display in San Torcuato, La Rioja.
- T.9-10 – DHC-4A on display in Fuenlabrada, Madrid.
- T.9-23 – C-7A on static display at the Villanubla Air Base in Villanubla, Castile and León. This airframe was previously operated by the 37th Transport Wing.
- T.9-25 – C-7A on static display at the Museo del Aire in Madrid. This airframe was previously operated by the former 37th Transport Wing.

=== Thailand ===
On display

- 12271 – DHC-4A on display at Camp Naresuan, Hua Hin District, Thailand.

=== United States ===
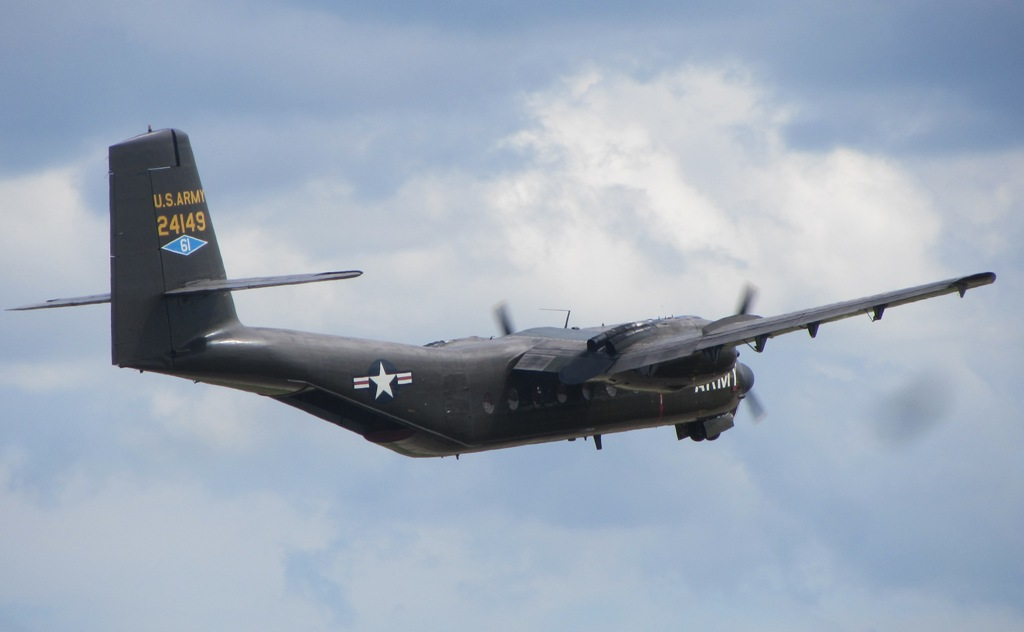
CV-2B 62-4149

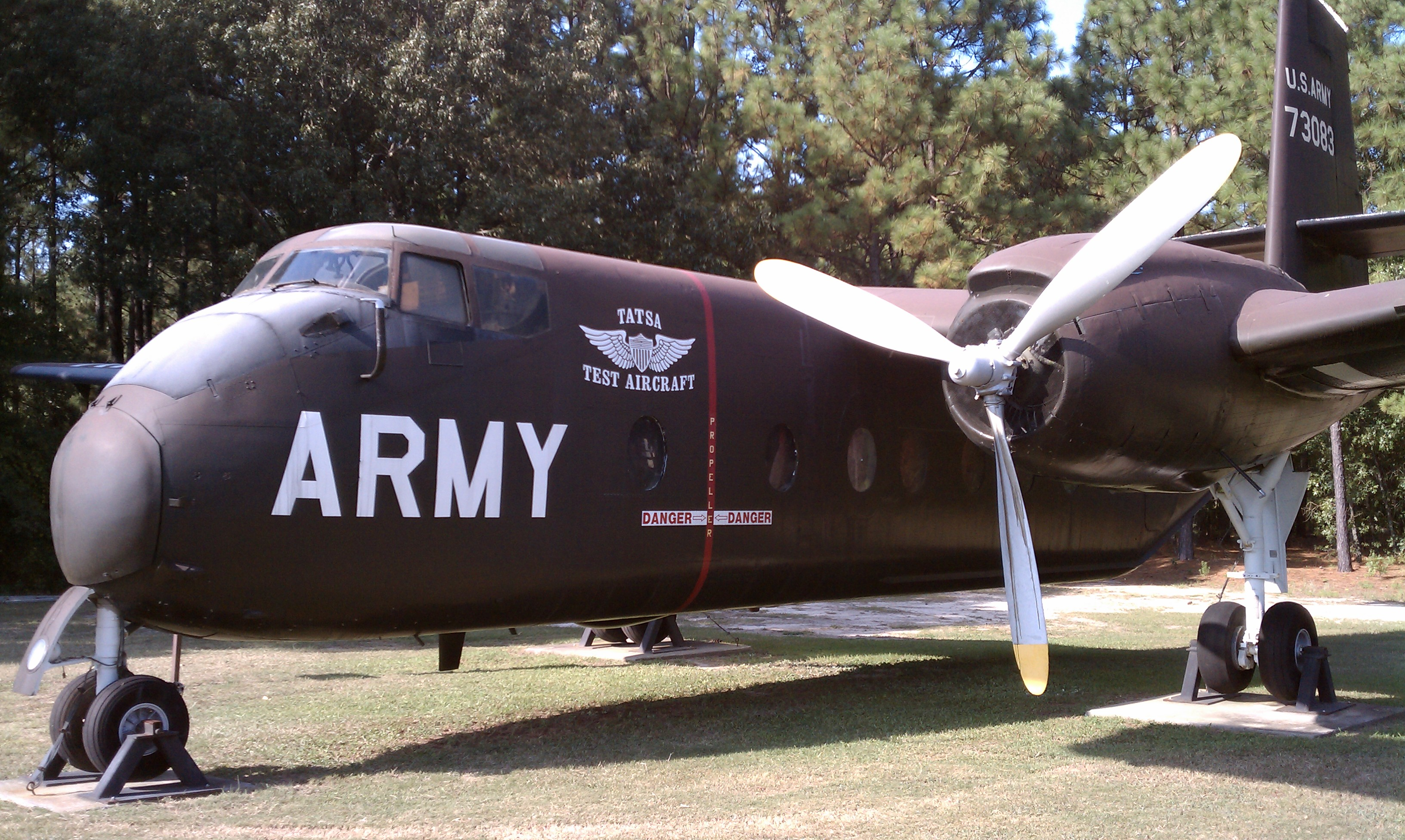
C-7 on display at the 82nd Airborne Division War Memorial Museum, once used by the Golden Knights parachute team

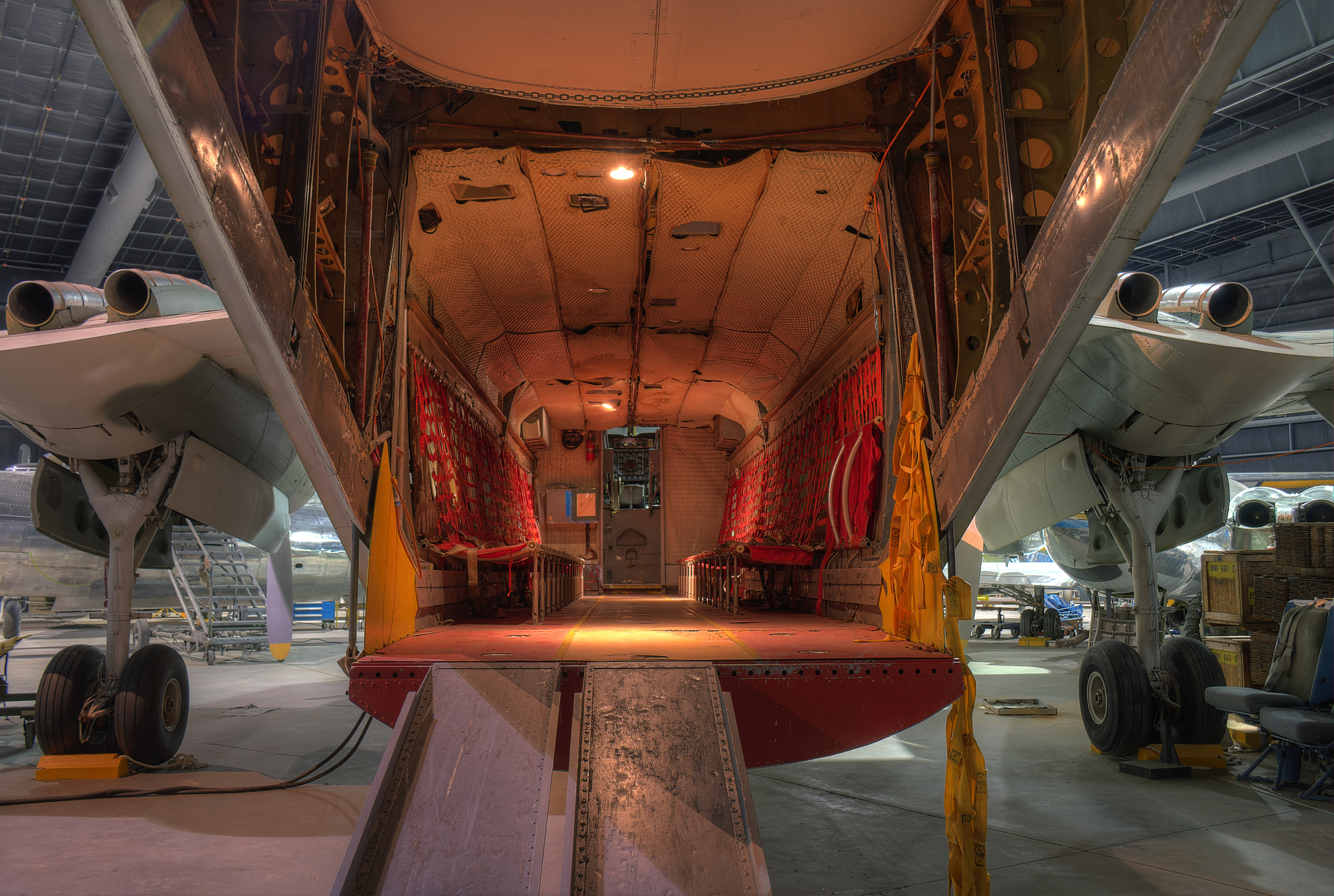
detail of C-7A Caribou at Museum of Aviation, Robins AFB

Airworthy

- 2 – DHC-2 airworthy with John K. Bagley of Rexburg, Idaho.
- 62-4149 – CV-2B airworthy at the Cavanaugh Flight Museum in Addison, Texas. Removed from public display when the museum indefinitely closed on 1 January 2024. To be moved to North Texas Regional Airport in Denison, Texas.

On display

- 57-3079 – YC-7A on static display at the U.S. Army Transportation Museum at Joint Base Langley–Eustis near Newport News, Virginia.
- 57-3080 – YC-7A on static display at the United States Army Aviation Museum at Fort Novosel near Daleville, Alabama.
- 57-3082 – YC-7A (4th of original 5 on order) on static display at Dyess Air Force Base, Abilene, TX Linear Air Park. The U.S.Army accepted delivery at the DeHavilland plant in Toronto, Ontario during late November, early December 1959. On 31 December 1966 this aircraft and equipment was transferred from U.S. Army ownership to U.S. Air Force ownership. The aircraft served the U.S. Air Force at headquarters, U.S.Air Force Logistics Command at Wright Petterson AFB, Dayton, Ohio. until 1975. It was then transferred to Pope AF at Fayetteville, NC to serve the "Golden Knights" parachute team as a jump aircraft. Later, when Dyess was seeking a C-7 for display, they sent a team down to Pope AFB and secured this particular machine in 1992. The 463rd Maintenance Squadron deployed to Pope AFB to break this aircraft down so it could be brought to Dyess by a C5B Galaxy. It was officially dedicated here 2 May 1992.
- 57-3083 – YC-7A on static display at the 82nd Airborne Division War Memorial Museum at Fort Bragg near Fayetteville, North Carolina.
- 60-3767 – C-7A on static display at the Travis Air Force Base Heritage Center at Travis Air Force Base near Fairfield, California.
- 62-4188 – C-7A on static display at the New England Air Museum in Windsor Locks, Connecticut.
- 62-4193 – C-7A on static display at the National Museum of the United States Air Force in Dayton, Ohio.
- 63-9756 – C-7B on static display at the Museum of Aviation in Warner Robins, Georgia.
- 63-9757 – C-7B at the March Field Air Museum near Riverside, California. Previously displayed at the Hill Aerospace Museum at Hill Air Force Base near Ogden, Utah.
- 63-9760 – C-7A on static display at the Air Mobility Command Museum at Dover Air Force Base near Dover, Delaware.
- 63-9719 – C-7B stored at the Texas Air & Space Museum in Amarillo, Texas.
- 63-9765 – C-7B in storage at the Air Force Flight Test Center Museum at Edwards Air Force Base near Edwards, California. Last known Caribou delivered to U.S. Army, in U.S. Army Golden Knights markings.

== Specifications (DHC-4A) ==
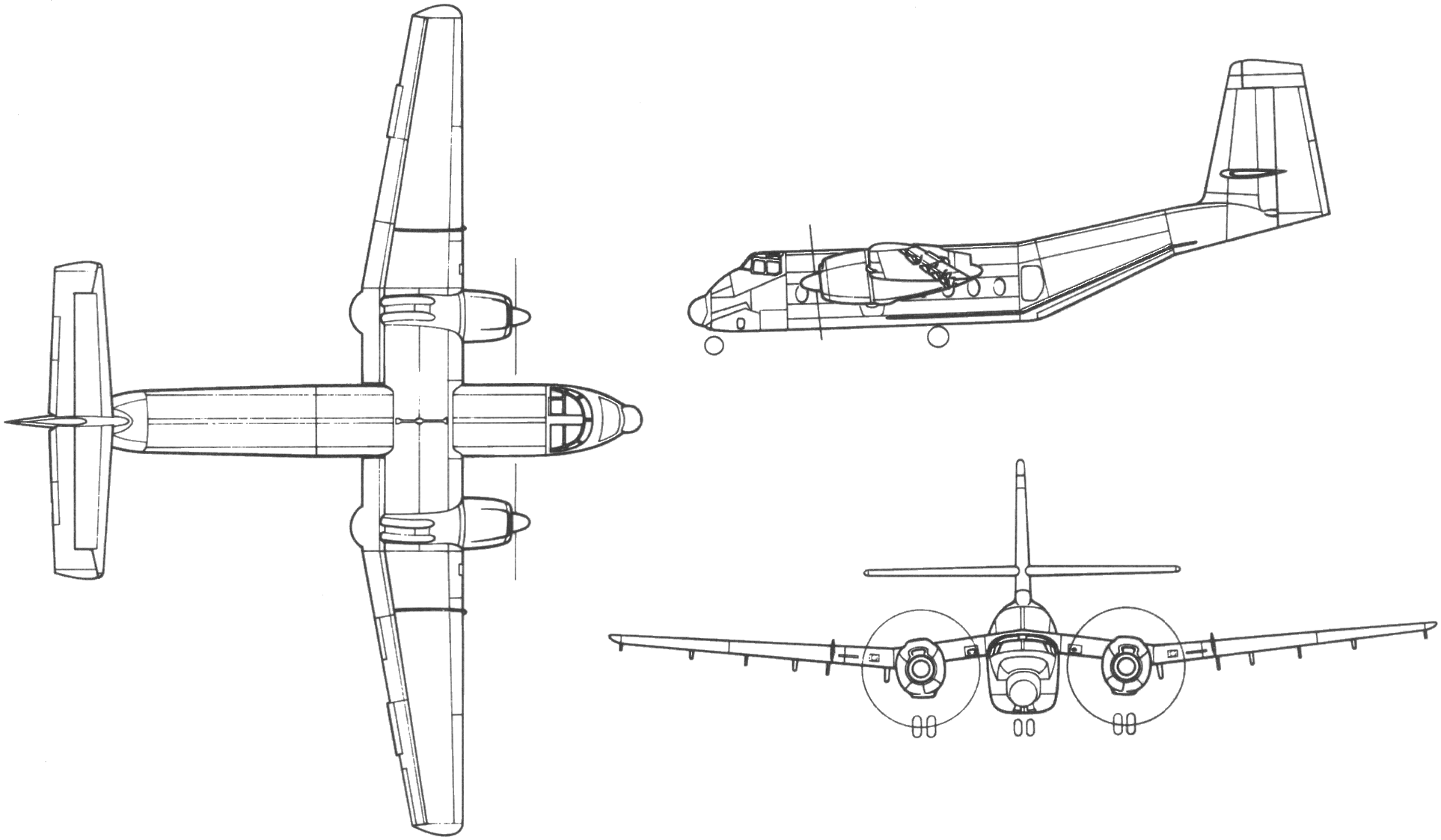
3-view line drawing of the de Havilland Canada C-7A Caribou

Data from Jane's All the World's Aircraft 1969-70

General characteristics

- Crew: 2 + loadmaster
- Capacity: 30 pax (civil) / 32 troops / 26 fully-equipped paratroops / 22 stretchers, 4 sitting patients and 4 attendants
- Length: 72 ft 7 in (22.12 m)
- Wingspan: 95 ft 7.5 in (29.147 m)
- Height: 31 ft 9 in (9.68 m)
- Wing area: 912 sq ft (84.7 m^{2})
- Aspect ratio: 10
- Airfoil: centre-section: NACA 64_{3}A417.5; tip: NACA 63_{2}A615
- Basic operating weight: 18,260 lb (8,283 kg)
- Maximum payload: 8,740 lb (3,964 kg)
- Maximum zero fuel weight: 27,000 lb (12,247 kg)
- Max takeoff weight: 28,500 lb (12,927 kg)
- Maximum permissible weight for ferry missions: 31,300 lb (14,197 kg)
- Maximum landing weight: 28,500 lb (12,927 kg)
- Fuel capacity: 690 imp gal (830 US gal; 3,100 L)
- Powerplant: 2 × Pratt & Whitney R-2000-7M2 Twin Wasp 14-cylinder air-cooled radial piston engines, 1,450 hp (1,080 kW) each
- Propellers: 3-bladed Hamilton Standard type 43D50-7107A fully-feathering constant-speed reversible-pitch propellers

Performance

- Maximum speed: 187 kn (215 mph, 346 km/h) at 6,500 ft (2,000 m)
- Cruise speed: 158 kn (182 mph, 293 km/h) at 7,500 ft (2,300 m) (maximum & econ)
- Stall speed: 59 kn (68 mph, 109 km/h)
- Never exceed speed: 208 kn (239 mph, 385 km/h)
- Range: 1,136 nmi (1,307 mi, 2,104 km) with maximum fuel inc. 45 minutes reserve

211 nmi (243 mi; 391 km) with maximum payload inc. 45 minutes reserve

- Service ceiling: 24,800 ft (7,600 m)
- Service ceiling on one engine: 8,800 ft (2,700 m)
- Rate of climb: 1,355 ft/min (6.88 m/s)
- Wing loading: 31.2 lb/sq ft (152 kg/m^{2}) maximum
- Power/mass: 0.102 hp/lb (0.168 kW/kg)

Avionics
Blind flying instrumentation standard fit

== See also ==
Related development

- DHC-5 Buffalo

Aircraft of comparable role, configuration, and era

- Scottish Aviation Twin Pioneer
- Transall C-160
