= Khalifa bin Zayed Air College =

UAE Air Force federal military academy in Al Ain, United Arab Emirates

- كلية خليفة بن زايد الجوية
- Type: Air force academy
- Established: June 1982
- Dean: Brigadier General Pilot Humood Ali Alshehhi
- Location: Al Ain, United Arab Emirates
- Colors: Blue and Gold
- Website: kbzac.ae

Khalifa bin Zayed Air College (KBZAC) (Arabic: كلية خليفة بن زايد الجوية) is a military air force academy and college of the United Arab Emirates Armed Forces and is the main training institution of the United Arab Emirates Air Force. It is located in Al Ain.

== History ==
The college was first established as a school of aviation in June 1982 at the location of Al Dhafra Air Base in Abu Dhabi by the United Arab Emirates founding father Sheikh Zayed bin Sultan Al Nahyan. The school was established to prepare and graduate military pilots for the UAE Air Force that are knowledgeable of the Middle East landscape and environment. In 1984 the school was renamed to the Air College and was commanded by Sheikh Mohammed bin Zayed Al Nahyan.

Due to the increasing number of students and enhanced aviation technology a new headquarters of the college was established in the city of Al Ain in 1995. The new headquarters was opened in 1996 and the college was renamed to Khalifa bin Zayed Air College pertaining to its leader, Sheikh Khalifa bin Zayed Al Nahyan, then crown prince of Abu Dhabi.

In 2007 the college was officially accredited as one of the UAE's educational institute by the UAE Ministry of Education. In July 2025, the Aviation Accreditation Board International (AABI) granted accreditation to four aviation programmes at Khalifa bin Zayed Air College: Fixed Wing Pilot, Helicopter Pilot, UAV, and Air Defence. The accreditation process was supported by the Centre of Excellence for Applied Research and Training (CERT).

== Curriculum ==
The college offers a Bachelor of Aviation in three aviation science and military aviation studies:

- Aviation fighter
- Helicopter aviation
- Unmanned aerial vehicles technologies

The college also offers studies in military air support and graduates air defense officers.

== Notable alumni ==
- Mariam Al Mansouri – The first female fighter pilot of the United Arab Emirates
- Hazza Al Mansouri – The first Emirati astronaut in space

== See also ==
- Zayed II Military College
