= Calidus B-350 =

Emirati attack aircraft

B-350
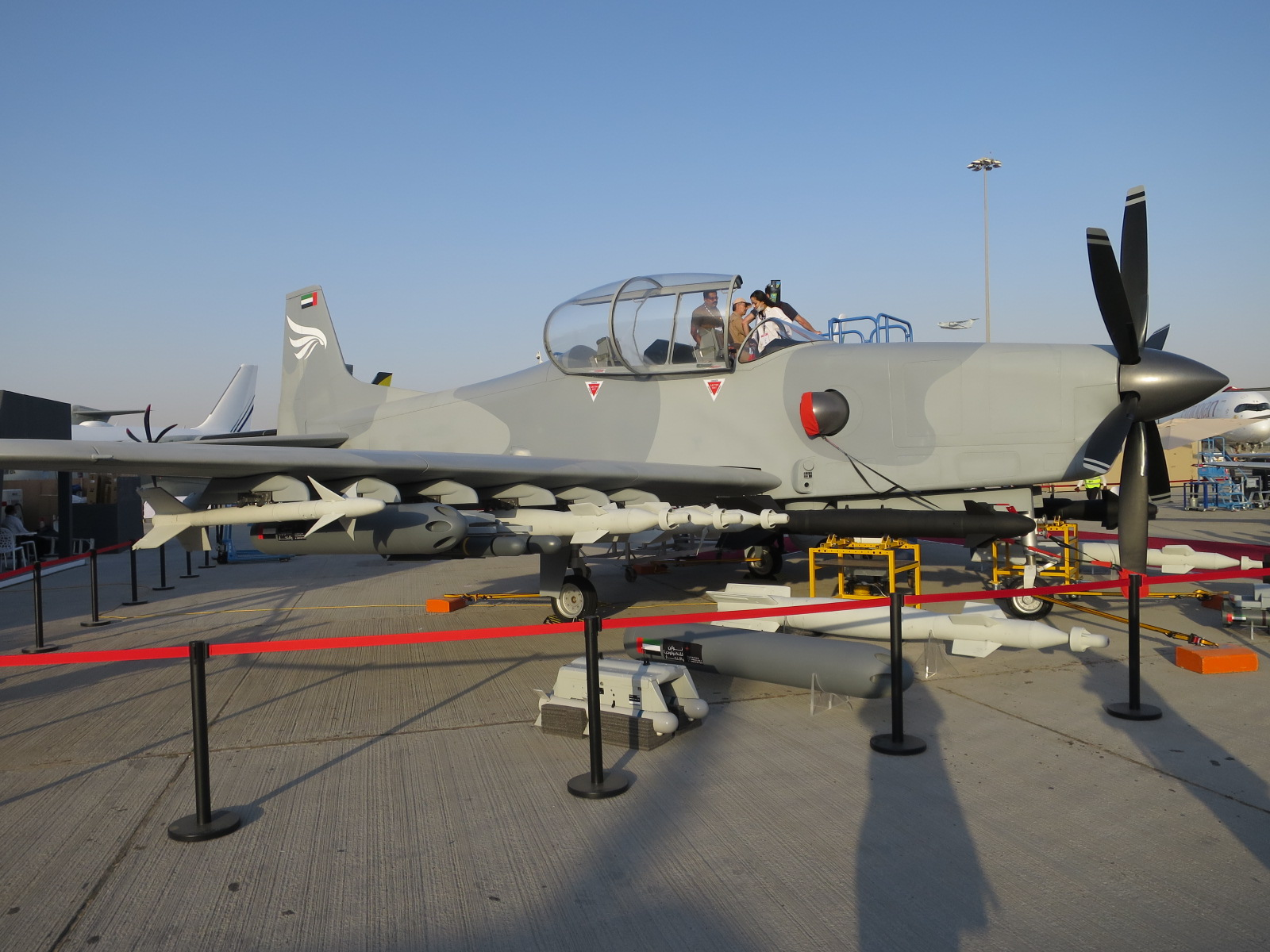
- Calidus B-350 mockup at Dubai Airshow 2021

General information
- Type: Attack aircraft
- National origin: United Arab Emirates
- Manufacturer: Calidus
- Status: Under development

The Calidus B-350 is an Emirati turboprop attack aircraft under development by Calidus.

== Design and development ==
The existence of the B-350 was first made public during the 2021 Dubai Airshow, where a full-scale mock-up of the aircraft was unveiled. The aircraft is a two-seat design to be powered by a single Pratt & Whitney Canada PW127 turboprop engine. Suspended armament will be carried on twelve underwing hardpoints. The aircraft's retractable tricycle landing gear will be built by the Czech company Charvát AXL.

Due to its large size compared to similar aircraft, comparisons have been drawn between the B-350 and the Douglas A-1 Skyraider.

== Specifications (B-350, estimated) ==
Data from AIN

General characteristics

- Crew: 2
- Wingspan: 15 m (50 ft) at least
- Max takeoff weight: 9,000 kg (19,842 lb)
- Powerplant: 1 × Pratt & Whitney Canada PW127 turboprop, 1,900 kW (2,600 shp)
- Propellers: 6-bladed

Armament

- 12 hardpoints

== See also ==
Aircraft of comparable role, configuration, and era

- Air Tractor AT-802
- Calidus B-250
- Embraer EMB 314 Super Tucano
- TAI Hürkuş
- UTVA Kobac
