= United Arab Emirates Air Force =

Aerial warfare branch of the United Arab Emirates' military

United Arab Emirates Air Force and Air Defence
- القوات الجوية والدفاع الجوي الاماراتي; Al-Quwwāt al-Jawiyah wa al-Defa' al-Jawiy al-ʾImārāty
- Badge of the United Arab Emirates Air Force and Air Defence
- Founded: 1968; 58 years ago
- Country: United Arab Emirates
- Type: Air force
- Role: Aerial warfare; Aerial defence
- Size: 592 aircraft
- Part of: UAE Armed Forces
- Engagements: 2011 military intervention in Libya; Saudi Arabian-led intervention in Yemen; Military intervention against ISIL; Islamic State insurgency in Puntland; 2026 Iran War

Commanders
- Current commander: Vice Marshal Ibrahim Nasser Mohammed Al Alawi

Insignia
- Roundel

- Fin flash

Aircraft flown
- Fighter: F-16 Fighting Falcon, Mirage 2000, Dassault Rafale
- Helicopter: CH-47, Bell 214, Bell 412, AS 350, AS 550, AS 565, Super Puma, IAR 330SM, AS 365, UH-60M
- Attack helicopter: AH-64D
- Reconnaissance: Dash 8MMA, CN-235MPA
- Trainer: Hawk, PC-7, PC-21, G 115, Aermacchi MB-339
- Transport: C-130 Hercules, CN-235, Cessna 208, C-17 Globemaster III, Airbus A330 MRTT

The United Arab Emirates Air Force (UAEAF) (Arabic: القوات الجوية والدفاع الجوي الاماراتي, romanized: al-Quwwāt al-Jawiyah wa al-Defa' al-Jawiy al-ʾImārāty) is the air force of the United Arab Emirates (UAE), part of the United Arab Emirates Armed Forces. The airforce was established in 1968 as a small air wing of the Trucial Oman Scouts. The air wing was later named Air Wing of the Abu Dhabi Defense Forces before later being incorporated into the Union Defence Force of the United Arab Emirates.

Since then, the airforce has undergone a continual reorganisation and expansion in terms of both capability and the number of aircraft. Currently, the UAEAF has around 4,000 personnel and operates approximately 592 aircraft.

== History ==
The UAE Air Force history began in May 1968, with the formation of an Air Wing of the Abu Dhabi Defence Force (ADDF) under British rule. Its key roles were to provide both a transport service and a ground attack support capability for ADDF land forces. Major investment in the early 1970s assured an expansion in terms of capabilities, quality, and quantity of aircraft. It also led to the renaming of the Air Wing to the ADDF Air Force in 1972. Training and instruction were provided by the Pakistan Air Force in the early years. During the 1973 Arab-Israel War (6-25 October 1973), the ADDF Air Force's Caribous served as air ambulances in Jordan.

The Emirate of Dubai maintained its own air component, the Dubai Defence Force Air Wing, until 1999, when the two were effectively merged to become what is now the United Arab Emirates Air Force. Although the integration of the two independent forces was completed, a small degree of autonomy exists at the operational command level, with the Western Air Command being headquartered in Abu Dhabi and the Central Air Command in Dubai. Since the 1980s, a combination of regional instability and high oil prices has resulted in an ambitious modernisation of the UAEAF to attain a level of capability matching the NATO standards. In the 1991 Gulf War, the UAE helped other countries by carrying out airstrikes against Iraqi forces.

In 2014, the UAE Air Force, along with the Egyptian Air Force, carried out airstrikes in Libya against Islamist factions in Tripoli.

In September 2014, UAE Air Force aircraft joined in US-led air strikes against terrorist targets in Syria and Iraq that later became known as Operation Inherent Resolve. These operations were suspended after a Jordanian pilot was captured by Islamic State militants in late December 2014, pending improvements in US search and rescue capabilities in the region.

In 2015, the UAE Air Force dropped bombs on ISIS targets in Syria. One of them was Major Mariyam Al Mansouri, the first female UAE Air Force pilot. The UAE military was also part of the Saudi Arabian-led intervention in Yemen from 2015 to 2025 when the UAE withdrew.

Begging 28 February 2026 and continuing into May, the United Arab Emirates faced repeated attacks involving ballistic missiles, cruise missile and drones launched by the terrorist Iranian regime. UAE air defences conducted interceptions throughout this period. By 8 May, the ministry of Defence reported that its systems intercepted 551+ ballistic missile, 29 cruise missiles and more than 2,263 drones since the attacks began.

On 15 May, the UAE Ministry of Foreign affairs described the cumulative total as around 3,300 intercepted attacks.

== Personnel and training ==
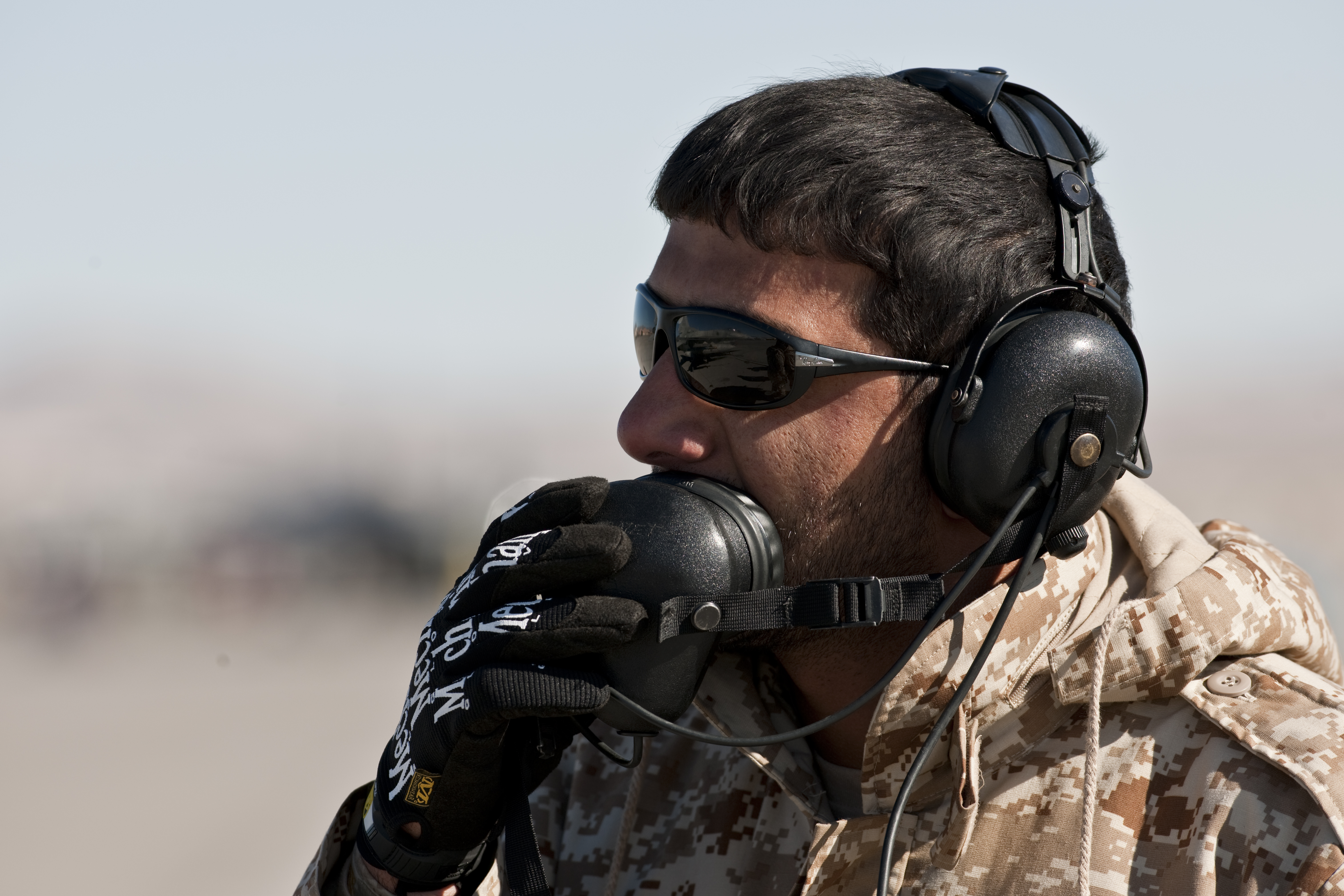
UAEAF crew chief communicating during an engine test at Nellis Air Force Base during Red Flag 11–2 on February 2, 2011.

During the formative years of the United Arab Emirates Armed Forces, foreign officers were recruited to train Emirati personnel, with British, Jordanian and Pakistani officers among those recruited during the 1960s and 1970s.

In 2002, the UAE Air Force consisted of about 4,000 personnel.

UAEAF candidates apply to the Khalifa bin Zayed Air College. Military pilot training is conducted at the college in Al Ain International Airport in Al Ain. The college trains both male and female military pilot officers and other aviation personnel in fields including fixed-wing aviation, helicopters, unmanned aerial vehicles and air defence. Women have served as combat pilots in the UAE Air Force and Air Defence. Mariam Al Mansouri is the UAE's first female fighter pilot and served as an F-16 pilot.

The United States has provided training associated with the UAE's F-16E/F Block 60 fleet. UAE F-16 pilot training began at Tucson Air National Guard Base in Arizona in September 2004, and the first group of Emirati pilots completed the training program in April 2005.

In 2009, the UAE acquired Pilatus PC-21 to modernize it's pilot-training fleet. The UAE ordered 25 PC-21 aircraft in 2009 for military pilot training, and delivery of the fleet was completed in January 2012.

== Overview ==
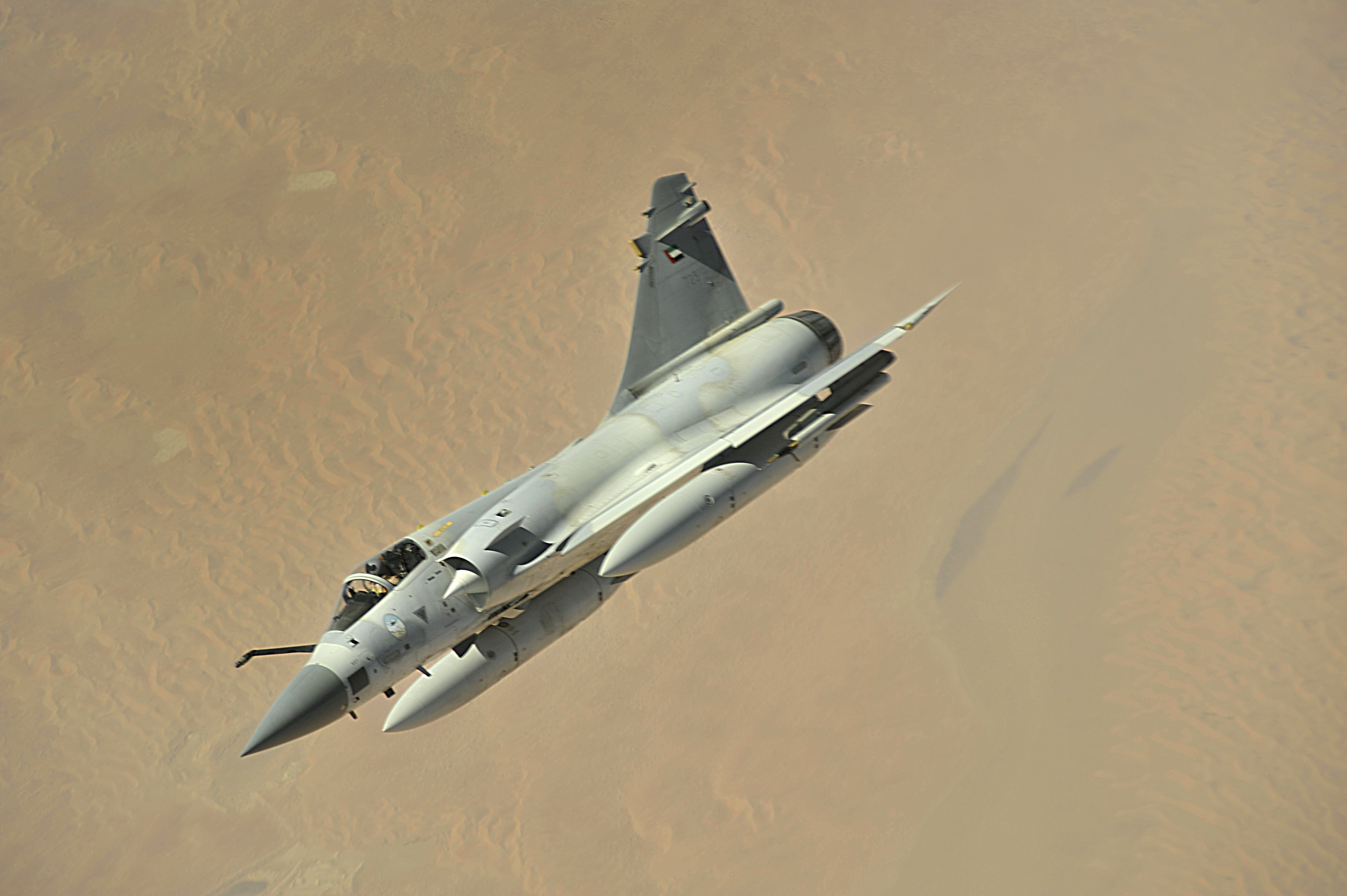
A UAEAF Mirage 2000 fighter.

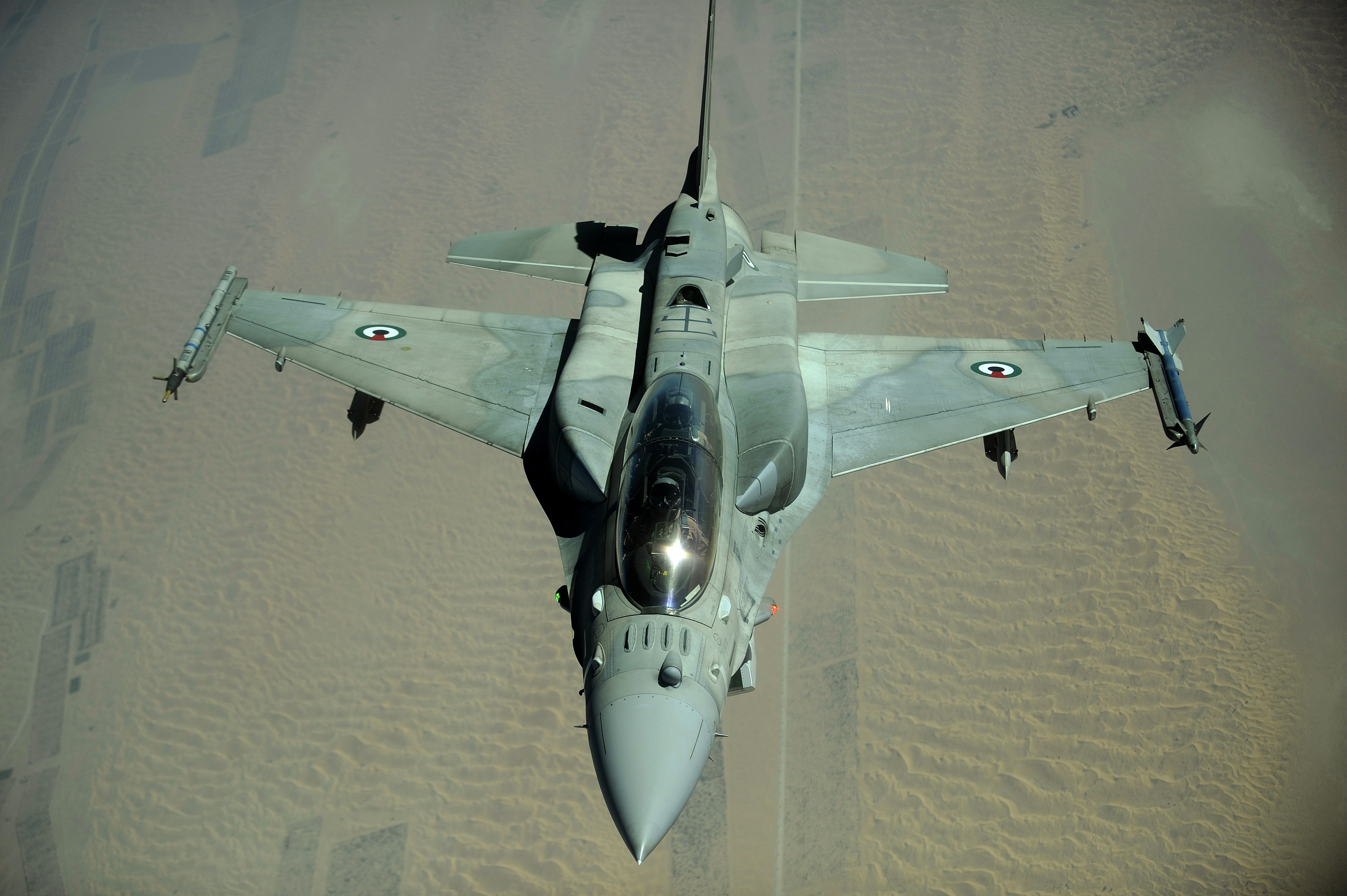
A UAEAF Lockheed Martin F-16 Block 60 developed specifically for the UAEAF. It is also called the F-16 Desert Falcon.

2007 marked the culmination of the largest procurement programmes ever undertaken by the UAE Air Force, with the final deliveries of the 80 F-16E/F Block 60 "Desert Falcons" and approximately 60 upgraded Mirage 2000-9, giving the air force a considerable multirole capability. These two investments represented a total expenditure of around $10 billion, with additional money spent on infrastructure and logistics. A $6.4 billion contract with Lockheed Martin for the supply and support of the 80 F-16s was signed in March 2000, while a $3.4 billion deal for the purchase of 30 new Mirage 2000-9 and retrofitting of the 33 older UAE Mirage 2000s was signed earlier in 1998. Missiles were also purchased: 160 AGM-88 HARMs, 1,000 or more AGM-65 Mavericks, about 500 AIM-120 AMRAAMs, 270 AIM-9 Sidewinders and 52 AGM-84 Harpoons. In November 2017, the United Arab Emirates Armed Forces announced their intention to sign a contract with Dassault Aviation for the upgrade of its Mirage 2000-9 aircraft. French newspaper La Tribune reported the modernization would cost roughly €300 million.

After a competition between the BAE Hawk, KAI T-50 Golden Eagle and Alenia Aermacchi M-346 Master, the UAEAF announced the acquisition of 48 trainer and light attack aircraft, with the first deliveries to take place in 2012. The other training types that are thought to be near replacement are the 30 Pilatus PC-7s and five Aermacchi MB-339s serving with the Air Academy at Al Ain. The MB-339 is also in use with the UAEAF flight display team, Al Fursan.

The UAEAF has operated 20 IAR 330 Puma helicopters since the late 1970s. These have been recently upgraded to the IAR-330SM standard by IAR Ghimbav in Romania in cooperation with Eurocopter. These aircraft, supplemented by a further ten ex-South African Air Force reworked SA-330s, are expected to remain in service for at least 15 years. Although no replacement for the Puma fleet is required in the immediate future, the force will be supplemented by 26 Sikorsky UH-60M Battlehawks, with 390 AGM-114N Hellfire II missiles. 30 AH-64A Apache helicopters were modernised as well, to the AH-64D Longbow standard, and a dozen Eurocopter Fennecs were recently acquired for special forces use.

The most important facility of the UAEAF is the Al Dhafra Air Base, with almost the entire fighter aircraft fleet located there. However, to prevent all of the air defence and strike assets being located at a single base, a $1 billion, completely new facility has been constructed deep in the Abu Dhabi desert, near the border corner with Saudi Arabia and Oman, near Al Gharbia, housing at least one Mirage 2000 unit. Al-Safran is believed to have opened around 2008. It is 3,000 m long and has aircraft parking nearly the same size as in Al Udeid Air Base, Qatar. A 4,000 m runway at Al-Safran Air Base was built around 2008.

=== Structure ===
As of 2008, the structure of the United Arab Emirates Air Force is as follows:

==== Western Air Command - HQ at Abu Dhabi ====
- Fighter Wing - Al Dhafra Air Base
  - 1st Shaheen Squadron - F-16E/F Block 60 Desert Falcon
  - 2nd Shaheen Squadron - F-16E/F Desert Falcon
  - 3rd Shaheen Squadron - F-16E/F Desert Falcon
  - 71st Fighter Squadron - Mirage 2000-9EAD/DAD
  - 76th Fighter Squadron - Mirage 2000-9EAD/DAD
  - 86th Fighter Squadron - Mirage 2000-9EAD/DAD (Al Safran Air Base)

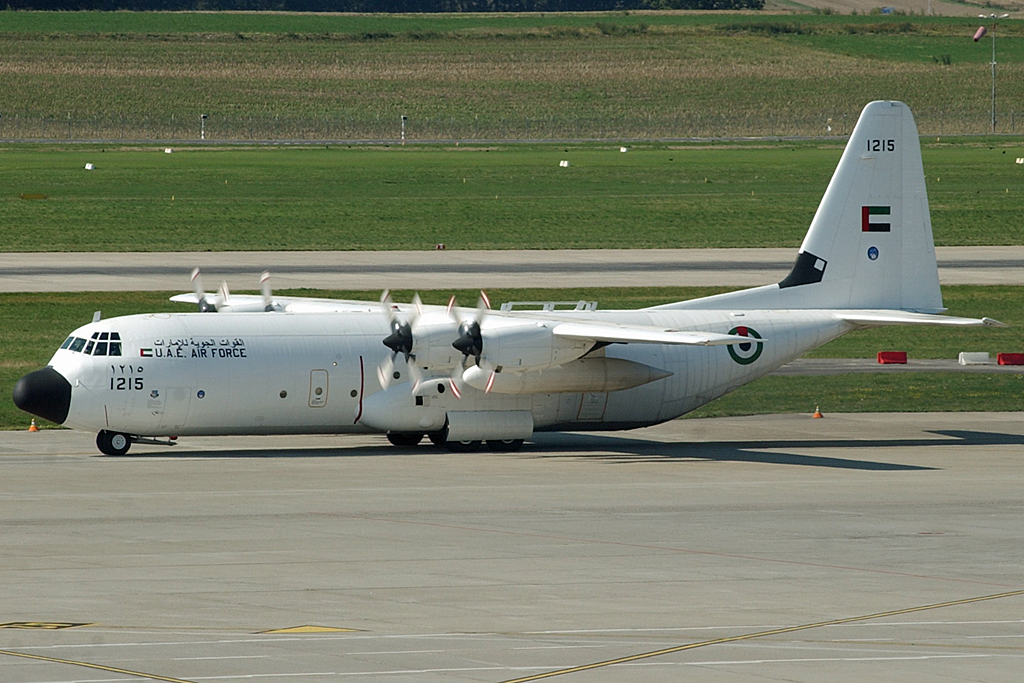
UAEAF Lockheed L-100 at Geneva International Airport, 2003

- Transport Wing - Al Bateen Air Base
  - 4th Squadron - C-130H Hercules
  - 4th Squadron - CN-235M-110
  - Puma Squadron - IAR-330SM Puma
  - 6th Squadron - AB.412HP/SP, Bell-214B
  - Naval Squadron - AS.332B/M Super Puma, AS.565SB Panther

==== Central Air Command - HQ at Dubai ====
- Al Minhad Air Base (helicopter base)
  - 102nd CAS Squadron - BAE Hawk Mk 102
  - 4th Squadron - C-130H-30, L-100-30 Hercules
  - 11th Special electronic missions Squadron Saab 340 AEW&C
  - Air-to-air refueling Squadron Airbus A330 MRTT
- Dubai International Airport (transport aircraft)

==== Joint Aviation Command (JAC) - HQ at Abu Dhabi ====
- Group 10 (Assault) - Al Dhafra Air Base
  - AH-64D Apache
- Group 18 (Special Operations) - Sas Al Nakheel Air Base
  - UH-60M, CH-47F
- Group 21 (Navy) - Sas Al Nakheel Air Base
  - AS332B1, AS332M1, AS565MB, AS565SB
- Group 22 (COIN and Reconnaissance) - Swaihan Air Base
  - Cessna 208B, DHC-6-300, DHC-6-400, Thrush S2R-T660
- Group 23 (Observation, Training) - Sas Al Nakheel Air Base
  - AS550C3
- Group 25 (Assault) - Sas Al Nakheel Air Base
  - CH-47F
- Group 26 (Assault) - Al Minhad Air Base, Sas Al Nakheel Air Base
  - UH-60L
  - UH-60M
- Group 28 (Observation and Reconnaissance) - Al Ain/Camp Hazza
  - Bell407GX

=== Commanders ===
- Mohamed bin Zayed Al Nahyan
- Mohammed Bin Rashid Al Maktoum
- Mohamed Al Qamzi
- Ibrahim Nasser Mohammed Al Alawi

== Equipment ==
=== Aircraft ===
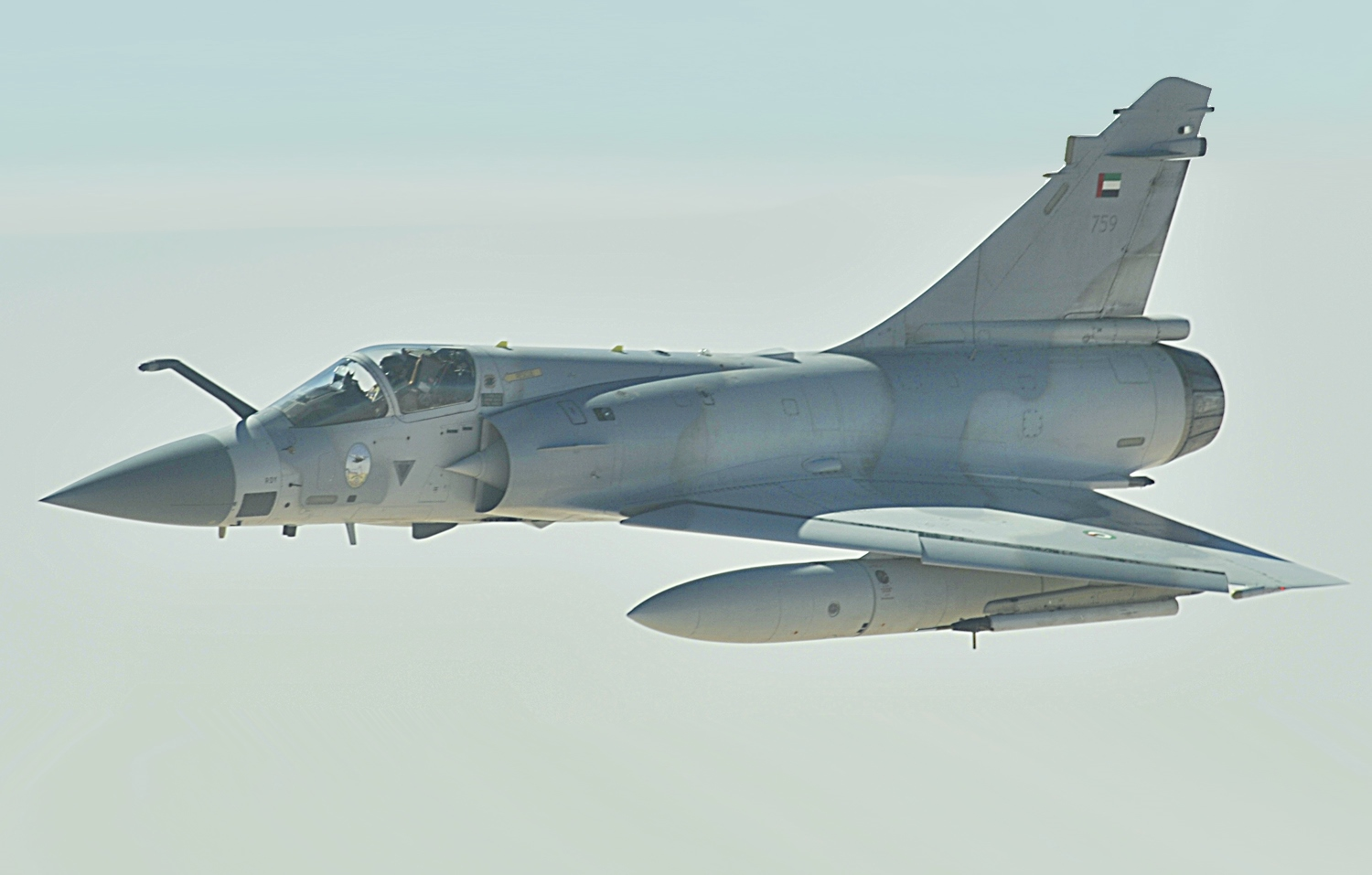
Emirati Mirage 2000

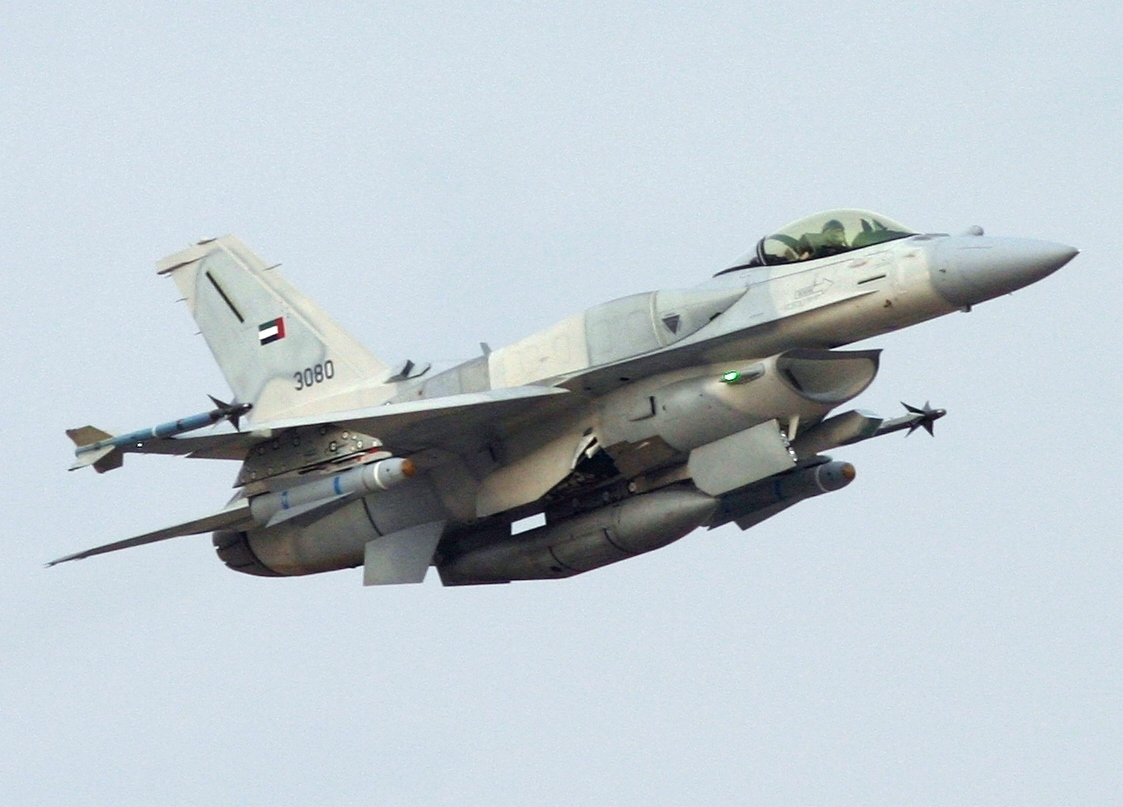
Emirati F-16E

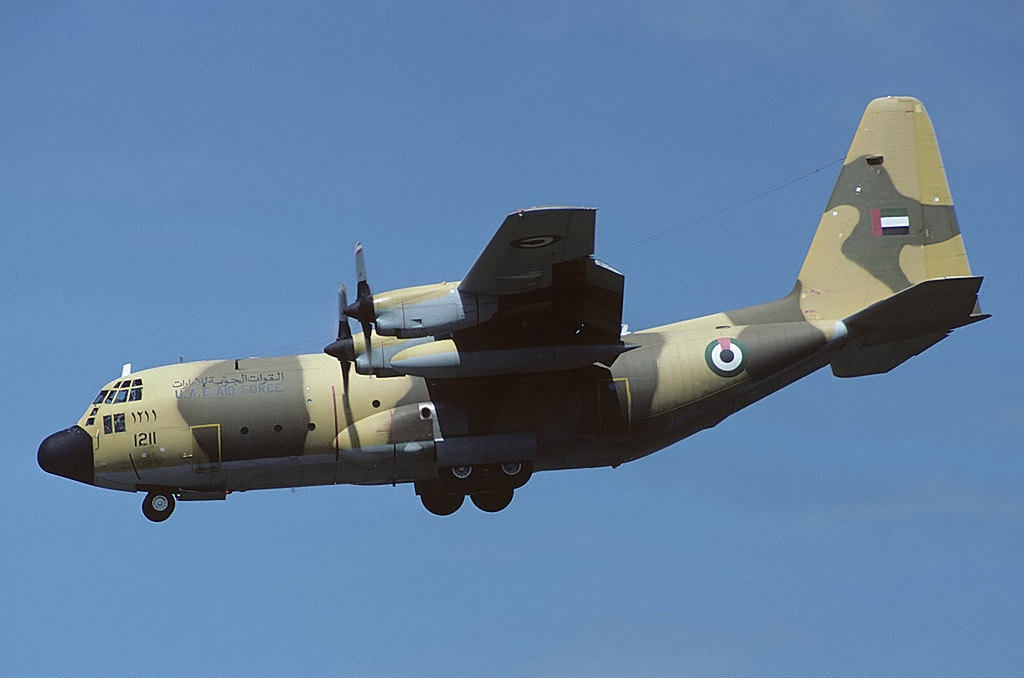
Emirati Lockheed C-130H Hercules

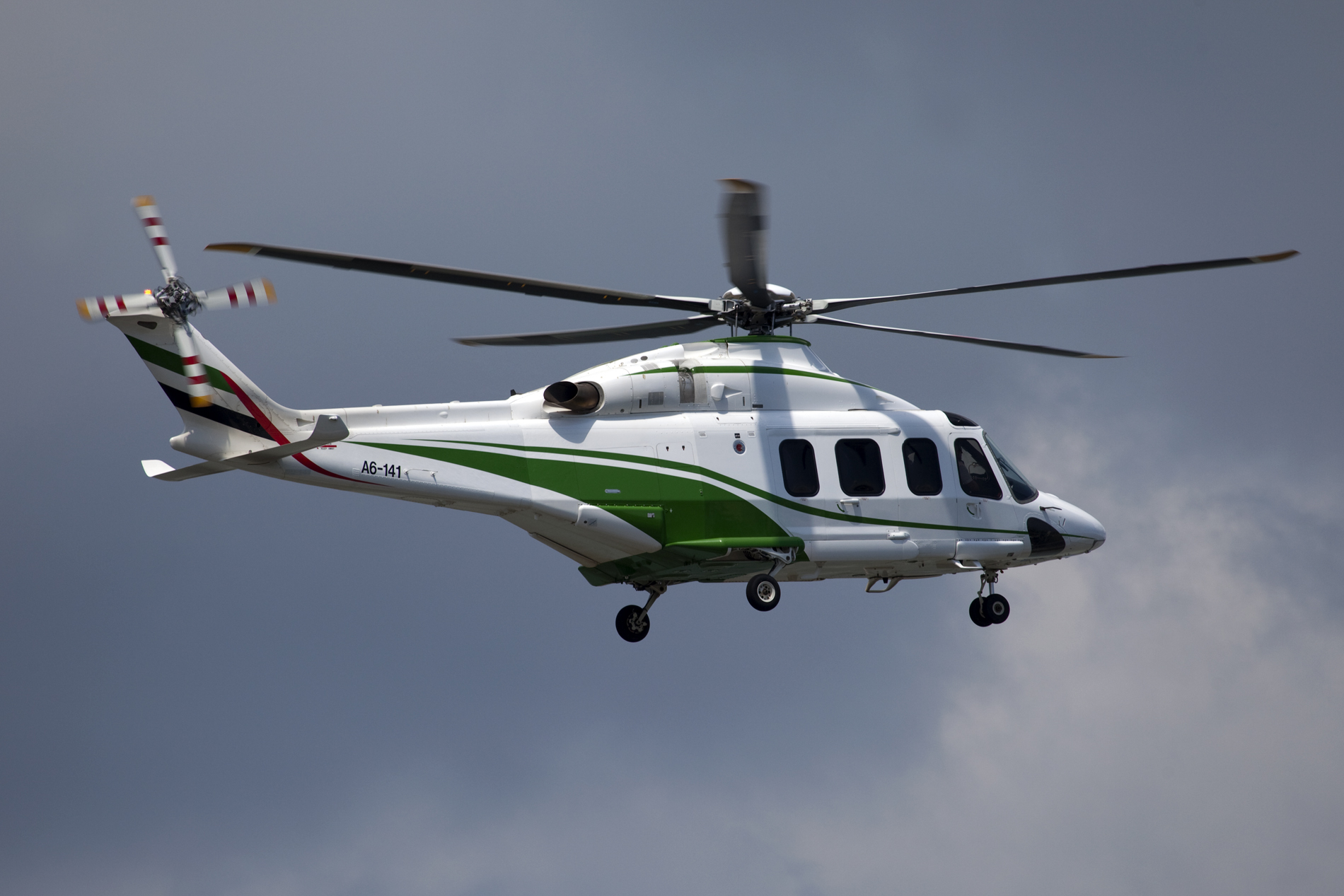
AW139 on lift off

| Aircraft | Origin | Type | Variant | In service | Notes |
Combat aircraft
| Calidus B-250 | United Arab Emirates | light attack | | | 24 on order |
| Dassault Mirage 2000 | France | multirole | 9/EAD/RAD | 44 | |
| Dassault Mirage 2000 | France | conversion trainer | 9/DAD | 15 | |
| Dassault Rafale | France | multirole | EU/DU F4 | | 80 on order |
| F-16 Fighting Falcon | United States | multirole | E Block 60 | 55 | |
| F-16 Fighting Falcon | United States | conversion trainer | F Block 60 | 21 | |
AEW&C
| Saab GlobalEye | Canada / Sweden | AEW&C | | 5 | |
Electronic warfare
| Bombardier Global Express | Canada | ELINT | Global 6000 | 2 | |
Reconnaissance
| Ayres Thrush | United States | reconnaissance / attack | IOMAX S2R-T660 Archangel | 24 | |
Maritime patrol
| Bombardier Dash 8 | Canada | maritime patrol | MPA-D8 | 2 | |
| Challenger 650 | Canada | maritime patrol | | 2 | |
Tanker
| Airbus A330 MRTT | Europe | tanker | | 5 | |
Transport
| Boeing C-17 | United States | strategic airlift | | 8 | |
| Airbus C295 | Spain | transport | | 7 | |
| Daher Kodiak | United States | utility | | 1 | |
| DHC-6 Twin Otter | Canada | utility | | 1 | |
| Lockheed C-130 | United States | transport | C-130H | 4 | |
| Lockheed L-100 | United States | transport | | 4 | |
| PAC P-750 | New Zealand | utility | | 1 | |
| Air Tractor AT-802 | United States | fire-fighter | | 16 | |
Helicopters
| Piaggio P.180 Avanti | Italy | medivac | | 2 | |
| AgustaWestland AW139 | Italy | utility | | 8 | |
| Bell 407 | United States | utility / trainer | | 1 | |
| Bell 412 | United States | utility | | 4 | |
| Eurocopter AS550 | France | utility / trainer | | 2 | |
| Eurocopter EC145 | Europe | utility | | 3 | |
Trainer
| Calidus B-250 | United Arab Emirates | conversion trainer | | | 40 on order |
| Bell 407 | United States | conversion trainer | | 13 | |
| Bell 505 | United States | trainer | | 12 | |
| BAe Hawk | United Kingdom | jet trainer | Hawk 61/63/102 | 12 | |
| Hongdu JL-10 | PRC | jet trainer | L-15 | 6 | 42 on order |
| Beechcraft King Air | United States | multi-engined trainer | King Air 90 | 3 | |
| Grob G 115 | Germany | basic trainer | | 12 | |
| Eurocopter AS350 | France | trainer | | 1 | |
| Pilatus PC-7 | Switzerland | advanced trainer | | 31 | |
| Pilatus PC-21 | Switzerland | advanced trainer | | 25 | |
UAV
| Denel Dynamics Seeker | South Africa | surveillance | Seeker II | 11 | |
| Baykar Bayraktar TB2 | Turkey | MALE UCAV | | | |
| MQ-1 Predator | United States | MALE UCAV | Predator XP | | |
| Wing Loong II | PRC | MALE UCAV | | | |
| Jeniah | United Arab Emirates | UCAV | | | Locally produced by ADASI / EDGE Group in the United Arab Emirates. |
| Garmoosha | United Arab Emirates | surveillance / light unmanned aircraft | | | Locally produced by ADASI / EDGE Group in the United Arab Emirates. |
| Jernas-M | United Arab Emirates | MALE multi-mission UAV | | | Locally produced by ADASI / EDGE Group in the United Arab Emirates. |
| Jernas-S | United Arab Emirates | compact MALE UAV | | | Locally produced by ADASI / EDGE Group in the United Arab Emirates. |
| REACH-S | United Arab Emirates | unmanned aircraft | | | Locally produced by EDGE in the United Arab Emirates. |
| Shadow 25 | United Arab Emirates | loitering UAV | | | Locally produced by ADASI / EDGE Group in the United Arab Emirates. |
| Shadow 50 | United Arab Emirates | long-endurance loitering UAV | | | Locally produced by ADASI / EDGE Group in the United Arab Emirates. |

=== Joint Air Command ===
| Aircraft | Origin | Type | Variant | In service | Notes |
Reconnaissance
| Cessna 208 | United States | surveillance / utility | | 13 | |
| DHC-6 Twin Otter | Canada | surveillance / utility | | 10 | 7 used for transport, STOL capable aircraft |
Transport
| AW609 | Italy | transport | | | 3 on order, STOL capable aircraft |
Helicopters
| Bell 407 | United States | light attack | | 29 | |
| AH-64 Apache | United States | attack | AH-64D/E | 30 | 39 on order |
| CH-47 Chinook | United States | transport / utility | CH-47C/F | 28 | 12 obtained from Libya |
| UH-60 Black Hawk | United States | utility | UH-60L/M | 80 | |
| Eurocopter AS565 | France | utility / SAR | | 12 | |
| Eurocopter AS350 | France | utility / rotorcraft trainer | | 15 | |
| Eurocopter AS332 | France | utility | | 8 | |
| AgustaWestland AW139 | Italy | utility / SAR | | 4 | |

=== Retired ===
Previous aircraft operated by the Air Force were the Dassault Mirage 5, Boeing 707, Aeritalia G.222, CASA C-212, SF.260T, Hawker Hunter, Alouette III, SA 342 Gazelle, Bölkow Bo 105, Bell 206 & Bell 214 helicopter.

=== Future equipment ===
As of 2019, multiple investigations for a UAE Next-Generation Fighter were initiated, request for proposals were sent to Boeing F/A-18 Super Hornet, Dassault Rafale, Eurofighter Typhoon, Lockheed Martin F-35A Lightning II and Sukhoi Su-57.

On 3 December 2021, the UAE signed an order for 80 Rafale F4. The Rafale is intended to replace the UAE's Mirage 2000-9.

France and the UAE are jointly developing Rafale F5 programme. Initially the UAE withdrew from the program in April 2026 after France imposed restrictions on technology transfers, however the deal was revived in October 2026 amid French budget woes.

== See also ==
- United Arab Emirates Armed Forces
- Khalifa bin Zayed Air College
