= Al-Safran Air Base =

Liwa Air Base
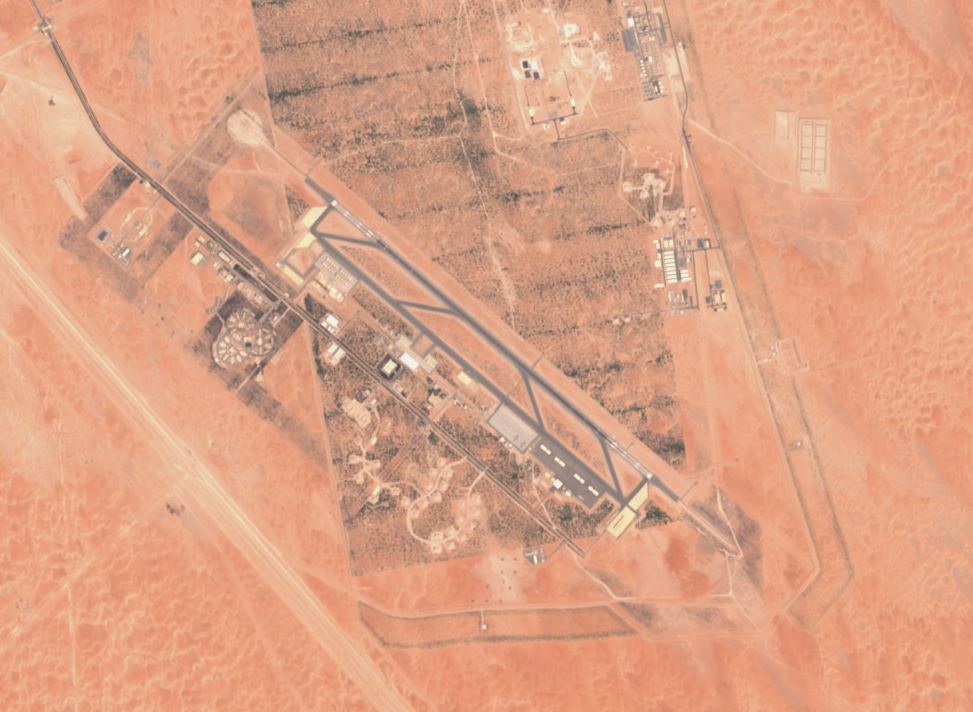
- IATA: none; ICAO: OMLW

Summary
- Airport type: Military
- Operator: United Arab Emirates Air Force
- Elevation AMSL: 394 ft / 120 m
- Coordinates: 23°39′7″N 53°49′14″E

Map
- Location in the United Arab Emirates

Runways
| Direction | Length | | Surface |
| Direction | ft | m | Surface |
|---|---|---|---|
| 13/31 | 12,040 | 3,670 | Paved |

The Al-Safran Air Base (ICAO: OMLW, alternatively called Liwa) is a military air base operated by the United Arab Emirates Air Force, located approximately 80 miles southwest of Abu Dhabi, near Madinat Zayed.

== History ==
Construction of the base cost an estimated $1 billion. Construction was carried out by Alnaboodah Construction Group A Mirage 2000 squadron was moved to the base in 2007, and it was completed in approximately 2008. The base underwent an expansion of its airport apron in 2017, the same year it added six new aircraft shelters.

== Description ==
The base has one runway, hardened aircraft shelters, and a subterranean ammunition dump. The bases houses two ground control stations. The base is defended by the Super aEgis II sentry gun.
