= Novaer =

Airplane manufacturer in the Brazil

- Company type: Private
- Industry: Aerospace Defense
- Founded: 1999
- Founder: Luiz Paulo Junqueira
- Headquarters: São José dos Campos, São Paulo, Brazil
- Key people: Joseph Kovács
- Products: Aircraft
- Number of employees: 200
- Website: http://www.novaer.ind.br/

Novaer is a Brazilian manufacturer of military aircraft and landing gear based in São José dos Campos, São Paulo.

== History ==
The company was founded in 1999 by the aerospace engineer Luiz Paulo Junqueira. The company develops and manufactures military and civil aircraft and is also one of the biggest exporters of landing gear systems for Embraer Tucano aircraft. In 2013 they start plans to production of the Novaer T-Xc in one single aircraft design type with two versions, both based on the proof of concept aircraft, the Novaer K-51, from designer Joseph Kovács. One version is a new military trainer for the primary and basic roles, designed with the Brazilian and other Air Forces in mind, and the other one is aimed to the General Aviation Market. T-Xc, low-wing, single-engine has been evaluated by Brazilian Air Force to replace the Neiva Universal trainer aircraft.

== Products ==
=== Calidus B-250 ===
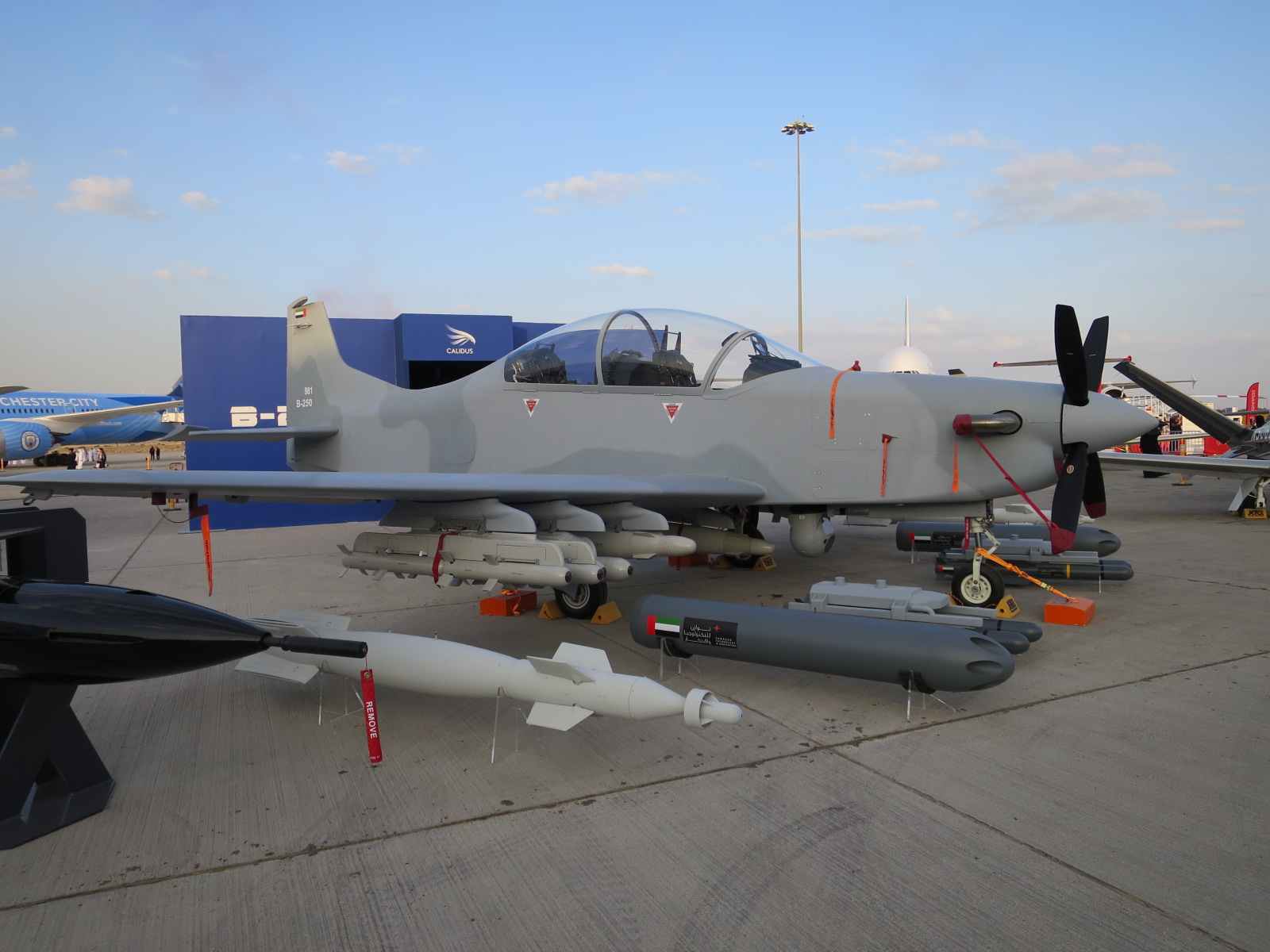
Calidus B-250 at Dubai Air Show 2019

Calidus B-250 is a light attack / trainer aircraft developed by Calidus in collaboration with Novaer, Rockwell Collins and Pratt & Whitney Canada. The B-250 was designed in Brazil by Novaer. The chief designer for the project was Joseph Kovács. It is specifically designed to serve the light combat and training requirements of air forces across the globe. The military trainer can support counterinsurgency (COIN) attack missions, reconnaissance, and search-and-rescue (SAR) operations. It can further simulate close air support (CAS), and intelligence, surveillance and reconnaissance (ISR) mission environments during combat training activities.

== Aircraft ==
Summary of aircraft built by Novaer
Model name	First flight	Number built	Type
Novaer Sovi	2014	1	Two seat trainer aircraft
Novaer Stardream			Two seat trainer aircraft
Novaer-Calidus B-250	2017	2	Tandem-seat light attack aircraft

== See also ==
- Embraer
- Indústria Aeronáutica Neiva
- Companhia Aeronáutica Paulista
- Aero Bravo
