= Novaer U-Xc Stardream =

Brazilian light aircraft

General information
- Type: Light aircraft
- National origin: Brazil
- Manufacturer: Novaer
- Status: In development
- Number built: 0

The Novaer U-Xc Stardream is a proposed four passenger, composite aircraft.

== History ==
The U-Xc Stardream was first proposed by Novaer Craft in 2010. The aircraft uses carbon fiber main and secondary structures with a fiberglass cowling. The aircraft is equipped with a ballistic parachute. Testing was first planned for the end of 2012, with production planned for 2015. However, this was postponed indefinitely due to Novaer Craft's limited staffing and financial constraints.

Novaer Craft shifted its focus to developing other aircraft, such as the Calidus B-250.

== Variants ==
T-Xc Pilgrim
Two seat military trainer variant, stressed for +6/-3g. Built in 2012, first flight took place in 2014.

== Specifications ==
Data from Aviation Week and Space Technology

General characteristics

- Crew: 1
- Capacity: 3 passengers
- Wingspan: 9.14 m (30 ft 0 in)
- Wing area: 12.46 m^{2} (134.1 sq ft)
- Empty weight: 887 kg (1,956 lb)
- Max takeoff weight: 1,555 kg (3,428 lb)
- Fuel capacity: 298 kg
- Powerplant: 1 × Lycoming IO-540 Horizontally Opposed Piston, 220 kW (300 hp)
- Propellers: 3-bladed Constant Speed

Performance

- Maximum speed: 370 km/h (230 mph, 200 kn)
- Cruise speed: 196 km/h (122 mph, 106 kn)
- Stall speed: 119 km/h (74 mph, 64 kn)
- Range: 2,450 km (1,522 mi, 1,323 nmi)
- Service ceiling: 7,600 m (25,000 ft)
- Rate of climb: 8.60 m/s (1,693 ft/min)

== See also ==
Aircraft of comparable role, configuration, and era

- Novaer T-Xc
- Pipistrel Panthera
- Cirrus SR22
