= Zayed II Military College =

Emirati officer academy

Coordinates: 24.15369°N 55.79228°E

- Active: 1972 - present
- Country: United Arab Emirates
- Branch: United Arab Emirates Army
- Type: Training
- Role: Officer Training
- Garrison/HQ: Al Ain
- Colors: Green, Red and Yellow
- Website: zmc.mil.ae

Commanders
- Current commander: Brigadier General Amer Mohamed Al Neyadi
- Commander-in-Chief: Khalifa bin Zayed Al Nahyan

Zayed II Military College or Zayed the Second Military College (Arabic: كلية زايد الثاني العسكرية) is an Emirati military college and the principle military academy and officer training institution in the United Arab Emirates Army based in Al Ain, United Arab Emirates. It was founded on February 1, 1972, by Sheikh Zayed bin Sultan Al Nahyan, the founding president of the United Arab Emirates.

== History ==
The military college was founded on 1 February 1972 by Sheikh Zayed bin Sultan Al Nahyan, the founding president of the United Arab Emirates, after 2 months of the independence of the United Arab Emirates. The college graduated its first batch of officers on April 10, 1972. It was officially inaugurated on May 3 by Sheikh Khalifa bin Zayed Al Nahyan.

Zayed II Military College celebrated its golden jubilee and 50th anniversary of founding on February 1, 2022.

== See also ==
- Khalifa bin Zayed Air College
