= 82nd Airborne Division War Memorial Museum =

- 82nd Airborne insignia

- Location in North Carolina
- Established: 1945
- Location: Fort Bragg, North Carolina, United States
- Coordinates: 35°07′49″N 79°01′22″W
- Type: military museum, aviation museum
- Collection size: 5,000 plus 82d Division related items
- Visitors: 50,000 plus a year
- Director: John Aarsen
- President: Mark Acker
- Curator: Jimmie Hallis
- Public transit access: post shuttle
- Website: 82ndairbornedivisionmuseum.com

The 82nd Airborne Division War Memorial Museum is a museum located at Ardennes and Gela Streets on Fort Bragg. Established in 1945, the museum chronicles the history of the 82nd Airborne Division from 1917 to the present including World War I, World War II, Vietnam War, and Persian Gulf Wars as well as campaigns in Grenada, Panama, Operation Golden Pheasant, Operation Restore Hope and Operation Enduring Freedom. The museum is open to the public but photo ID and a vehicle search is required to enter Fort Bragg.

The museum seven acres of grounds serve as a location for military ceremonies as well.

== Exhibits ==
The collection includes light armor weapons, rifles, handguns, and uniforms from multiple eras including captured arms and uniforms of enemy forces including German paratrooper and Luftwaffe. Personal items including a name tag and military uniform belonging to Manuel Noriega, captured during Operation Just Cause.

=== Aircraft ===
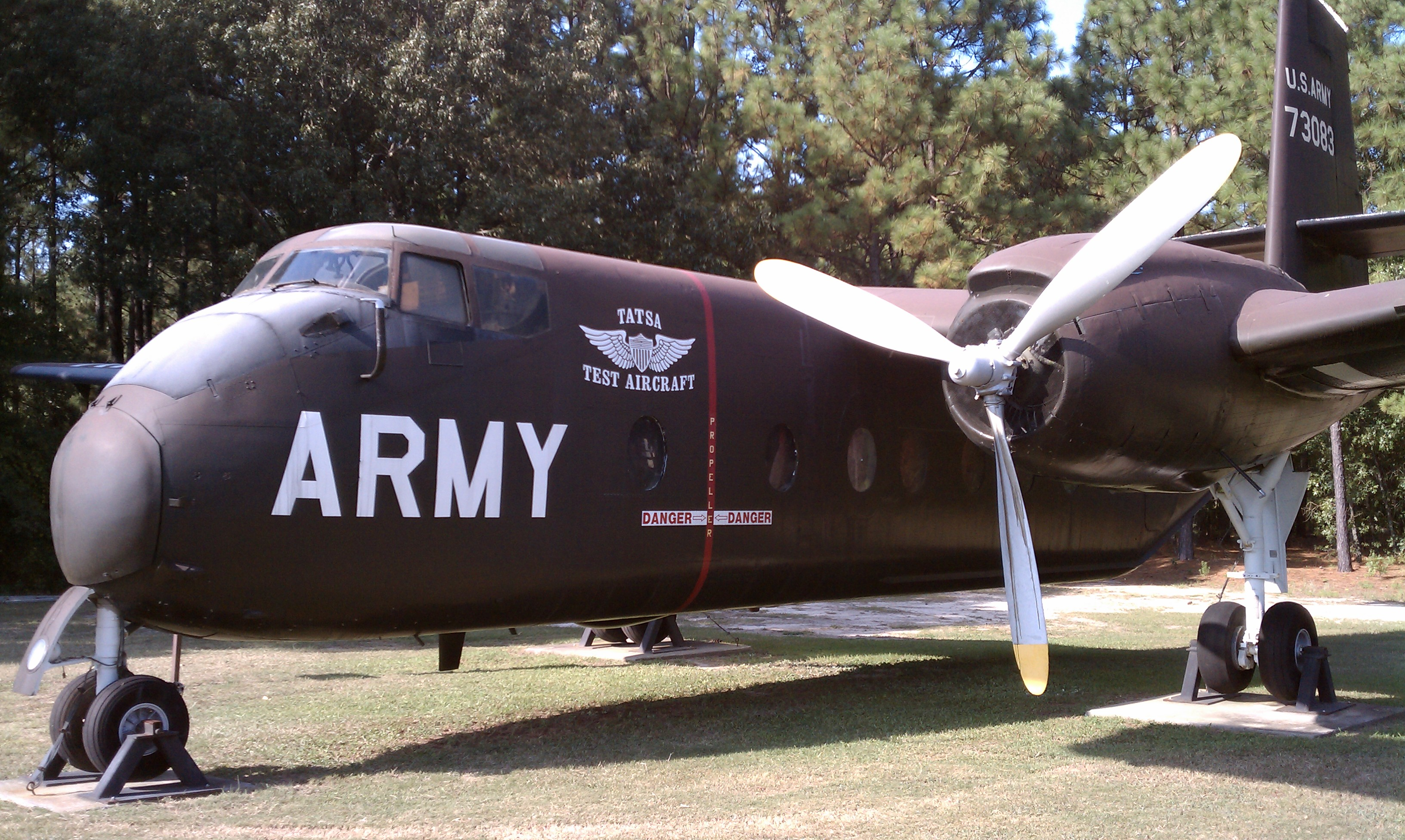
C-7 on display at the museum, once used by the Golden Knights parachute team.

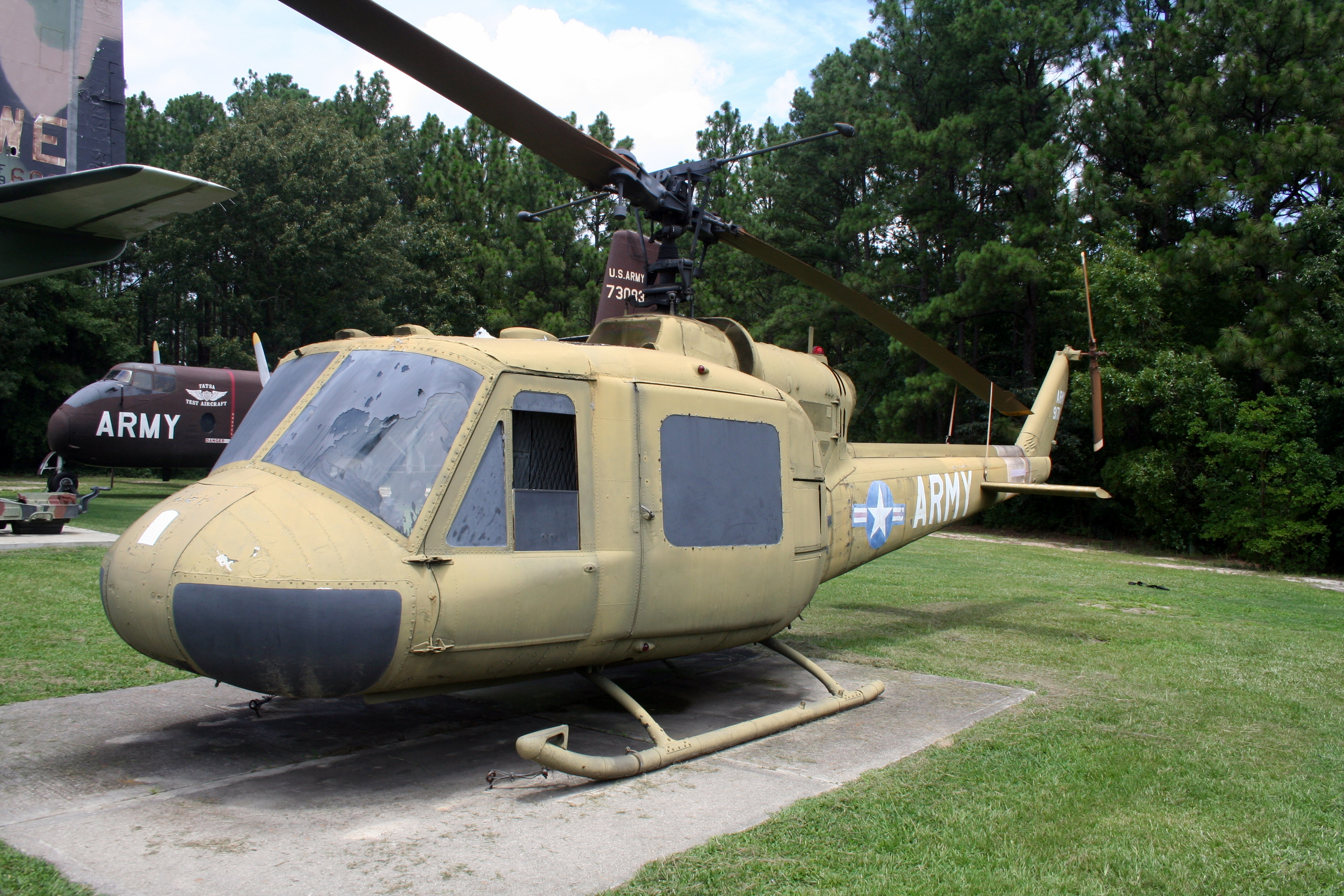
Bell UH-1A Iroquois.

- Fairchild C-119 Flying Boxcar
- Douglas C-47 Skytrain
- de Havilland Canada C-7 Caribou
- Bell UH-1A Iroquois
- Curtiss C-46F Commando
- Fairchild C-123K Provider

=== Ground Vehicles ===
- M551 Sheridan
- M56 Scorpion

== Funding ==
The museum has multiple sources of funding. Its two buildings, with 14,000 square feet in total, were built with privately raised funds. Maintenance and utilities are covered by Fort Bragg, and the museum and exhibits are owned by the Army. From a baseline budget of $482,000 from the United States Army Center of Military History, the museum received around $400,000 in 2025. These funds go primarily toward salaries and benefits for three civilian museum employees. The nonprofit 82nd Airborne Division Historical Society funds informational panels and special events and donates additional funds to the museum (approximately $30,000 in 2024).

== Opposition to proposed closure ==
In June 2025, the museum was one of 29 military history facilities targeted for closure. The 82nd Airborne Division Historical Society led supporters in opposition to the closure through activities including a letter-writing campaign and local billboards. In December 2025, Congress passed the National Defense Authorization Act for Fiscal Year 2026, which established criteria for Congressional oversight of military museum closures. In April 2026, the Center of Military History stopped its planned closure of this and other museums.
