= Mariam al-Mansouri =

First Emirati female fighter pilot (born 1979)

Mariam Hassan Salem Al Mansouri
- Born: 1979 (age 46–47); Abu Dhabi, United Arab Emirates
- Education: United Arab Emirates University Khalifa bin Zayed Air College
- Occupation: UAEAF fighter pilot
- Known for: First Emirati female fighter pilot

Mariam al-Mansouri (Arabic: مريم حسن سالم المنصوري; born 1979) is the first female fighter pilot in the United Arab Emirates. She was one of the first women to join the United Arab Emirates Air Force (UAEAF) academy, graduating in 2007. She flies an F-16 Fighting Falcon and led UAE mission airstrikes against ISIS over Syria.

== Early life and education ==
Al-Mansouri is one of eight children. Her family is related to Sultan bin Saeed Al Mansoori, an engineer and politician in the UAE. In an interview with Deraa Al Watan magazine, she said that her family supported her career goals, but she had to overcome gender stereotypes along the way. It helped that she had finished high school with excellent marks. She earned an undergraduate degree in English literature from United Arab Emirates University.

== Career ==
Al-Mansouri served in the army before starting flight training. She attended the Khalifa bin Zayed Air College of the United Arab Emirates Air Force for pilots, graduating in 2007. She received the Mohammed bin Rashid Pride of the Emirates medal for excellence in her field.

Before the Syrian airstrikes, al-Mansouri was profiled in The National, an Abu Dhabi newspaper, in June 2014. In July 2014, CNN interviewed her about her career in the UAE Air Force. She said she aspired to become a pilot since high school, but had to wait until women were permitted. In the meantime, she earned her degree and worked for the army general staff in other capacities.

=== 2014 military intervention against ISIS in Syria ===
The United Arab Emirates were among the five Arab allies that joined the United States in the 2014 military intervention against ISIS in Syria in 2014 to defeat ISIS forces, and were first to participate. In an interview with MSNBC, Yousef Al Otaiba, Emirati ambassador to the United States, recounted that when U.S. Air Force tanker pilots radioed in to speak with the UAE mission during air refueling and heard al-Mansouri's voice, they were initially surprised and silent for a short time. Al Otaiba called her a "fully qualified, highly trained, combat-ready pilot". He regards al-Mansouri as a role model for women in Islamic and Arab states. Al Otaiba said, "I think it's important for us moderate Arabs, moderate Muslims, to step up and say: 'this is a threat against us'".

Spiegel Online and Frankfurter Allgemeine Zeitung referred to al-Mansouri's reception in social media where she had been dubbed "Lady Liberty" and "nightmare of the ISIS fighters". Spiegel used the title "Operation Wüstenmaid" (Operation Desert Maiden). The German news source started a sort of PR campaign. The Arab states of the Persian Gulf used her example and the involvement of Saudi prince Chalid bin-Salman, pilot of an IDS Panavia Tornado, against extremism. Some statements in a broadcast of Fox News Channel's The Five about al-Mansouri were deemed sexist by international media. The next day, Eric Bolling, co-host of the early evening talk show, apologized for his remarks.

The Times of Israel remained skeptical about the "femme fatale". Al-Mansouri's involvement in the aerial missions may have brought the UAE positive media attention. The Times referred to the actual mixed record on women's rights and the UAE ranking tenth in a list of 22 Arab nations with regard to equality for women.
