= Novaer T-Xc =

Brazilian trainer aircraft

T-Xc

General information
- Type: Basic trainer
- National origin: Brazil
- Manufacturer: Novaer
- Designer: Joseph Kovacs
- Status: In development
- Number built: 1

History
- First flight: 22 Aug 2014

The Novaer T-Xc is a prototype two-seat training aircraft designed and built by in Brazil by Novaer.

== Design and development ==
The T-Xc is a low-wing, cantilever monoplane with retractable tricycle landing gear. It has an enclosed cockpit with two side-by-side configuration seats. It has a single Lycoming IO-540 piston engine in tractor configuration.

The T-Xc was developed to replace the Neiva Universal in Brazilian Air Force service. It was designed by Joseph Kovacs based on his K-51 aerobatic aircraft project. The prototype first flew from São José dos Campos Airport on 22 August 2014. A proposed development is a four-seat utility aircraft variant.

== Variants ==
T-Xc
Two-seat trainer variant
U-Xc
Four-seat utility aircraft
