= San Torcuato =

- Municipality
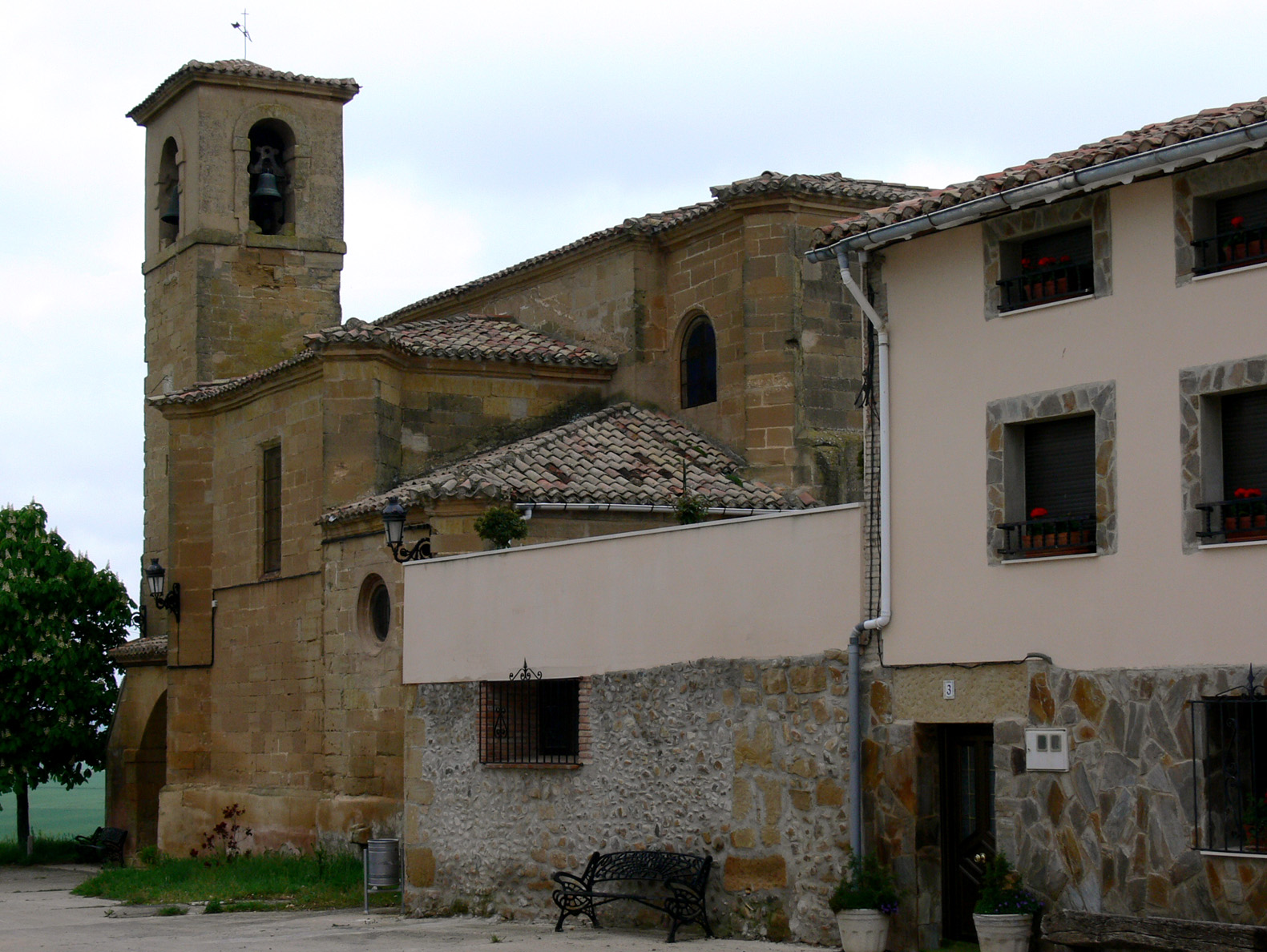
- View of San Torcuato

- Location within La Rioja, Spain Location within Spain
- Coordinates: 42°28′55″N 2°53′24″W
- Country: Spain
- Autonomous community: La Rioja
- Comarca: Haro

Government
  - Mayor: Silvia Muñoz Pérez (PP)

Area
  - Total: 10.82 km^{2} (4.18 sq mi)
- Elevation: 602 m (1,975 ft)

Population (2025-01-01)
  - Total: 62
- Postal code: 26291

San Torcuato is a village in the province and autonomous community of La Rioja, Spain. The municipality covers an area of 10.82 square kilometres (4.18 sq mi) and as of 2011 had a population of 83 people.
