= Outline of the United Arab Emirates =

Country in West Asia

The flag of the United Arab Emirates

The emblem of the United Arab Emirates

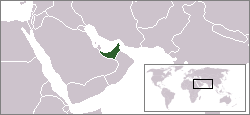
The location of the United Arab Emirates

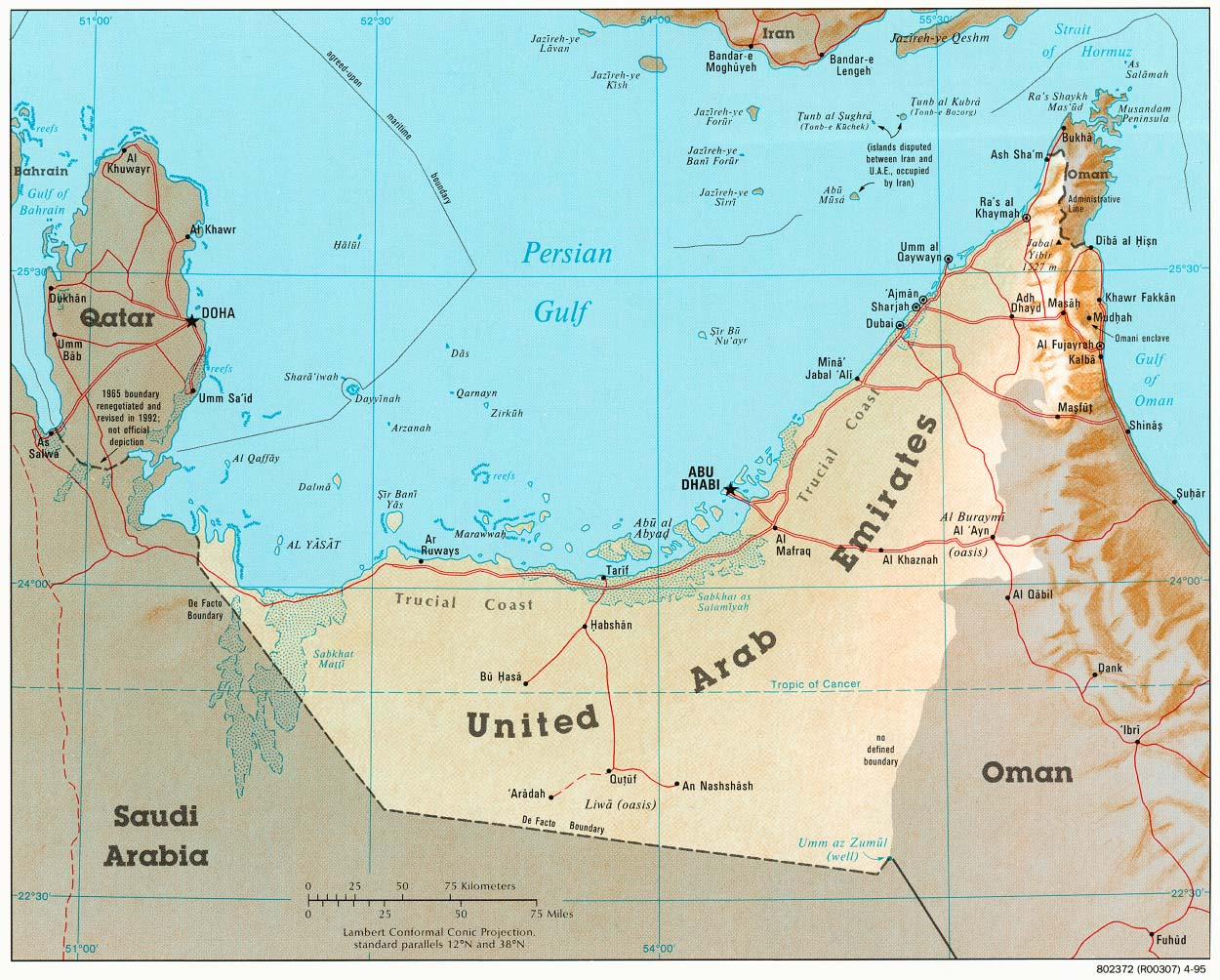
An enlargeable relief map of the United Arab Emirates

The following outline is provided as an overview of and topical guide to the United Arab Emirates:

United Arab Emirates – sovereign federation of seven states located southeast of the Persian Gulf on the Arabian Peninsula in West Asia, bordering Oman and Saudi Arabia. The seven states, termed emirates, are Abu Dhabi, Ajman, Dubai, Fujairah, Ras al-Khaimah, Sharjah, and Umm al-Quwain.

== General reference ==
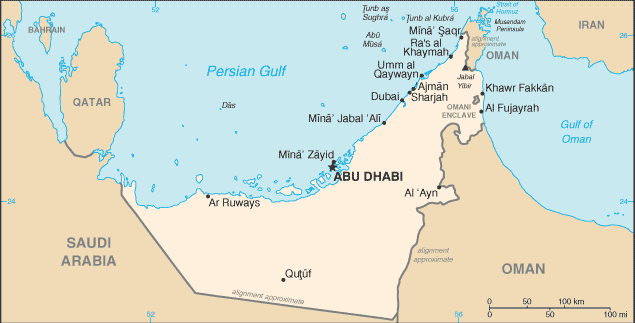
An enlargeable basic map of the United Arab Emirates

- Common English country name: The United Arab Emirates
- Official English country name: The United Arab Emirates
- Historic endonym: Maganite (ancient); Trucial Coaster (medieval)
- Common endonym(s): United Arab Emirates, Trucial Coast, Emirates, El Eimaraat or the UAE
- Official endonym(s):
- Adjectival(s): Imaratis
- Demonym(s):
- Etymology: Name of the United Arab Emirates
- International rankings of the United Arab Emirates
- ISO country codes: AE, ARE, 784
- ISO region codes: See ISO 3166-2:AE
- Internet country code top-level domain: .ae

== Geography of the United Arab Emirates ==
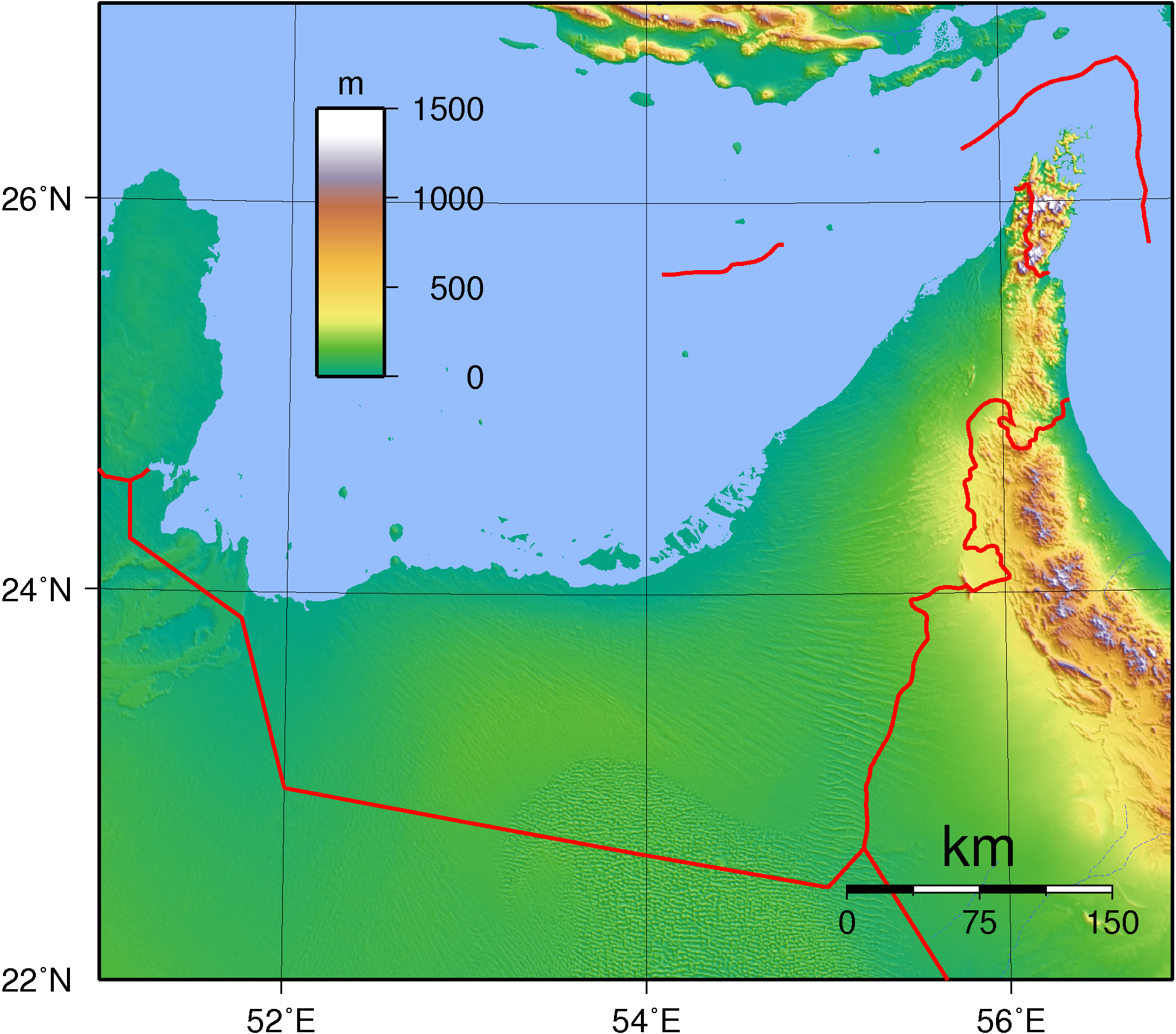
An enlargeable topographic map of the United Arab Emirates

- The United Arab Emirates is: a country
- Location:
  - Northern Hemisphere and Eastern Hemisphere
  - Eurasia
    - Asia
      - Southwest Asia
  - Middle East
    - Arabian Peninsula
  - Time zone: UTC+04
  - Extreme points of the United Arab Emirates
    - High: Unnamed knoll west of Jabal Bil Ays 1,910 m (6,266 ft)
    - Low: Persian Gulf and Gulf of Oman 0 m
  - Land boundaries: 867 km

Saudi Arabia 457 km
Oman 410 km

- Coastline: 1,318 km

- Population of the United Arab Emirates:
- Area of the United Arab Emirates:
- Atlas of the United Arab Emirates

=== Environment of the United Arab Emirates ===
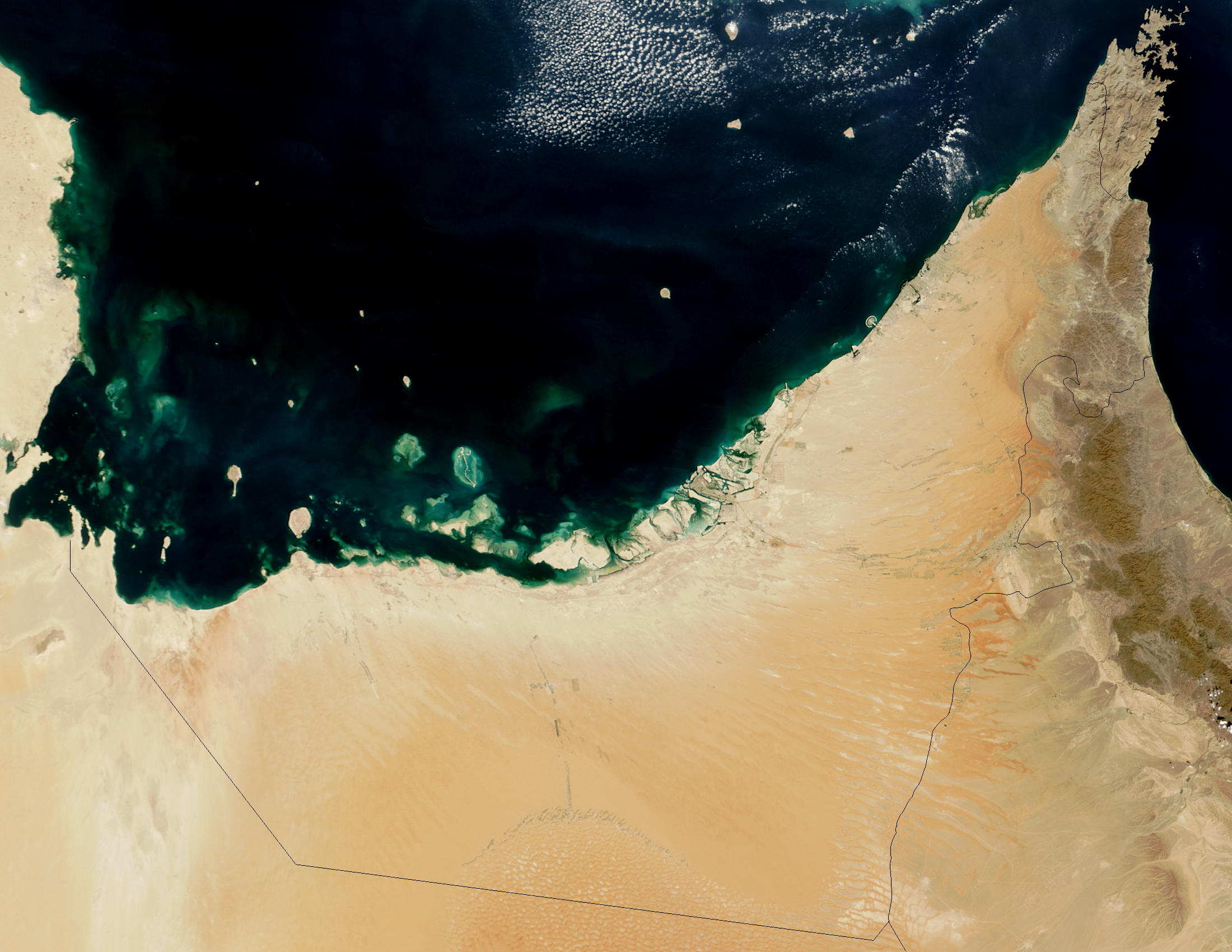
An enlargeable satellite image of the United Arab Emirates

- Climate of the United Arab Emirates
- Geology of the United Arab Emirates
- Protected areas of the United Arab Emirates
- Wildlife of the United Arab Emirates
  - Fauna of the United Arab Emirates
    - Birds of the United Arab Emirates
    - Mammals of the United Arab Emirates

==== Natural geographic features of the United Arab Emirates ====
- Islands of the United Arab Emirates
- Lakes of the United Arab Emirates
- Mountains of the United Arab Emirates
- Rivers of the United Arab Emirates
- World Heritage Sites in the United Arab Emirates: None

==== Administrative divisions of the United Arab Emirates ====

- Abu Dhabi
- Ajman: 2 exclaves
- Dubai: 1 exclave
- Fujairah: 2 exclaves
- Ras al-Khaimah: 1 exclave
- Sharjah: 3 exclaves
- Umm al-Quwain

=== Demography of the United Arab Emirates ===
Demographics of the United Arab Emirates

== Government and politics of the United Arab Emirates ==
- Form of government: federal presidential elected monarchy
- Capital of the United Arab Emirates: Abu Dhabi
- Elections in the United Arab Emirates
- Political parties in the United Arab Emirates
- Taxation in the United Arab Emirates

=== Branches of the government of the United Arab Emirates ===
Qasr Al Watan

Government of the United Arab Emirates

==== Executive branch of the government of the United Arab Emirates ====
- Head of state: President of the United Arab Emirates, Mohamed bin Zayed Al Nahyan
  - Vice President of the United Arab Emirates, Mohammed bin Rashid Al Maktoum & Mansour bin Zayed Al Nahyan
- Head of government: Prime Minister of the United Arab Emirates, Mohammed bin Rashid Al Maktoum
- Cabinet of the United Arab Emirates

==== Legislative branch of the government of the United Arab Emirates ====
- Federal National Council

==== Judicial branch of the government of the United Arab Emirates ====
- Supreme Court of the United Arab Emirates

=== Foreign relations of the United Arab Emirates ===
Foreign relations of the United Arab Emirates

- Diplomatic missions in the United Arab Emirates
- Diplomatic missions of the United Arab Emirates

==== International organization membership ====
The United Arab Emirates is a member of:

- Arab Bank for Economic Development in Africa (ABEDA)
- Arab Fund for Economic and Social Development (AFESD)
- Arab Monetary Fund (AMF)
- Cooperation Council for the Arab States of the Gulf (GCC)
- Food and Agriculture Organization (FAO)
- Group of 77 (G77)
- International Atomic Energy Agency (IAEA)
- International Bank for Reconstruction and Development (IBRD)
- International Chamber of Commerce (ICC)
- International Civil Aviation Organization (ICAO)
- International Criminal Court (ICCt) (signatory)
- International Criminal Police Organization (Interpol)
- International Development Association (IDA)
- International Federation of Red Cross and Red Crescent Societies (IFRCS)
- International Finance Corporation (IFC)
- International Fund for Agricultural Development (IFAD)
- International Hydrographic Organization (IHO)
- International Labour Organization (ILO)
- International Maritime Organization (IMO)
- International Mobile Satellite Organization (IMSO)
- International Monetary Fund (IMF)
- International Olympic Committee (IOC)
- International Organization for Standardization (ISO)
- International Red Cross and Red Crescent Movement (ICRM)
- International Telecommunication Union (ITU)
- International Telecommunications Satellite Organization (ITSO)
- Inter-Parliamentary Union (IPU)
- Islamic Development Bank (IDB)
- League of Arab States (LAS)
- Multilateral Investment Guarantee Agency (MIGA)
- Nonaligned Movement (NAM)
- Organisation of Islamic Cooperation (OIC)
- Organisation for the Prohibition of Chemical Weapons (OPCW)
- Organization of Arab Petroleum Exporting Countries (OAPEC)
- Organization of Petroleum Exporting Countries (OPEC)
- United Nations (UN)
- United Nations Conference on Trade and Development (UNCTAD)
- United Nations Educational, Scientific, and Cultural Organization (UNESCO)
- United Nations Industrial Development Organization (UNIDO)
- Universal Postal Union (UPU)
- World Customs Organization (WCO)
- World Federation of Trade Unions (WFTU)
- World Health Organization (WHO)
- World Intellectual Property Organization (WIPO)
- World Meteorological Organization (WMO)
- World Trade Organization (WTO)

=== Law and order in the United Arab Emirates ===
- Constitution of the United Arab Emirates
- Crime in the United Arab Emirates
- Human rights in the United Arab Emirates
  - LGBT rights in the United Arab Emirates
  - Freedom of religion in the United Arab Emirates
  - Capital punishment in the United Arab Emirates
  - Legal system of the United Arab Emirates
  - Human trafficking in the United Arab Emirates
  - Migrant workers in the United Arab Emirates
- Law enforcement in the United Arab Emirates

=== Military of the United Arab Emirates ===
Military of the United Arab Emirates

- Command
  - Commander-in-chief:President of the United Arab Emirates
    - Ministry of Defence of the United Arab Emirates
- Forces
  - Army of the United Arab Emirates
  - Navy of the United Arab Emirates
  - Air Force of the United Arab Emirates
  - Presidential Guard of United Arab Emirates
- Military history of the United Arab Emirates

=== Local government in the United Arab Emirates ===
Local government in the United Arab Emirates

== History of the United Arab Emirates ==
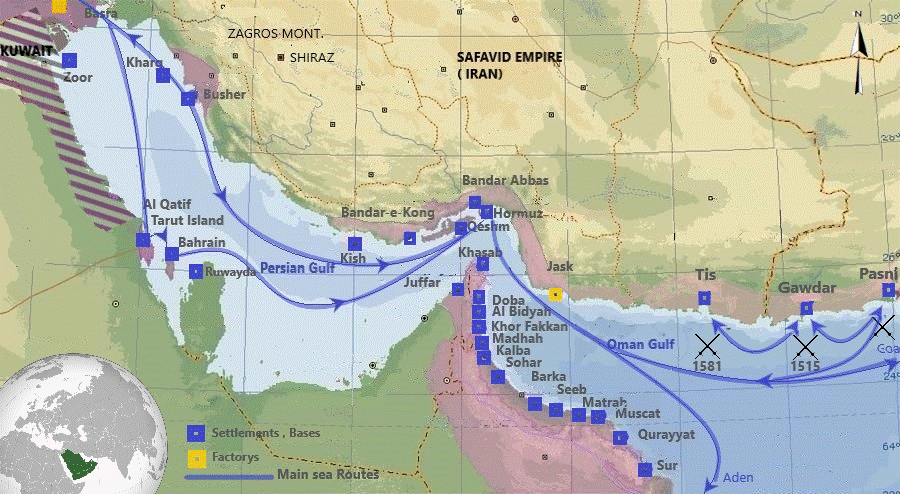
Portuguese colonies in Arabia

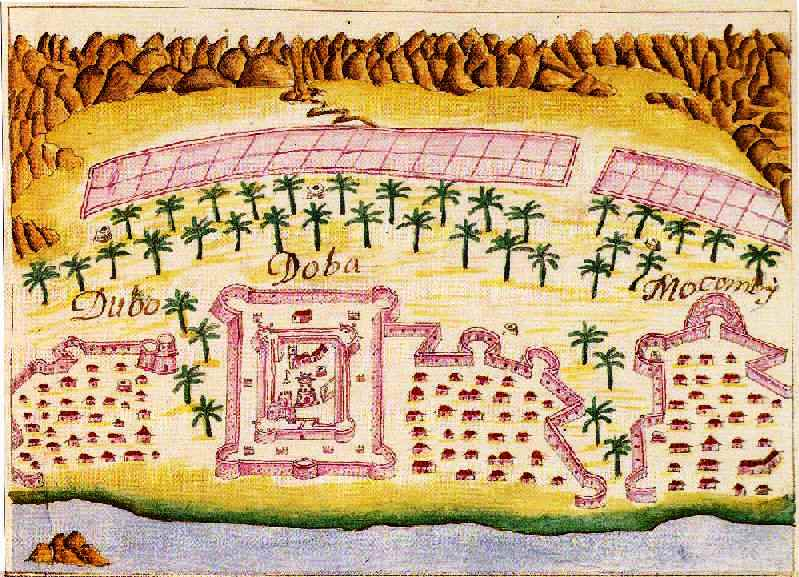
Doba Fort, built by the Portuguese Empire in Dibba Al-Hisn in 1620.

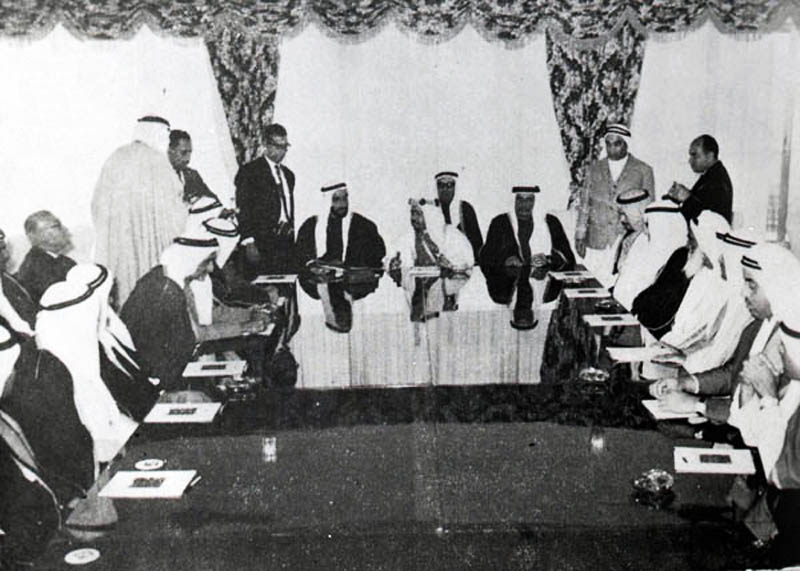
First conference on the Gulf federation in Abu Dhabi, 1968.

Other articles:

- Military history of the United Arab Emirates
- National Center for Documentation and Research

== Culture of the United Arab Emirates ==
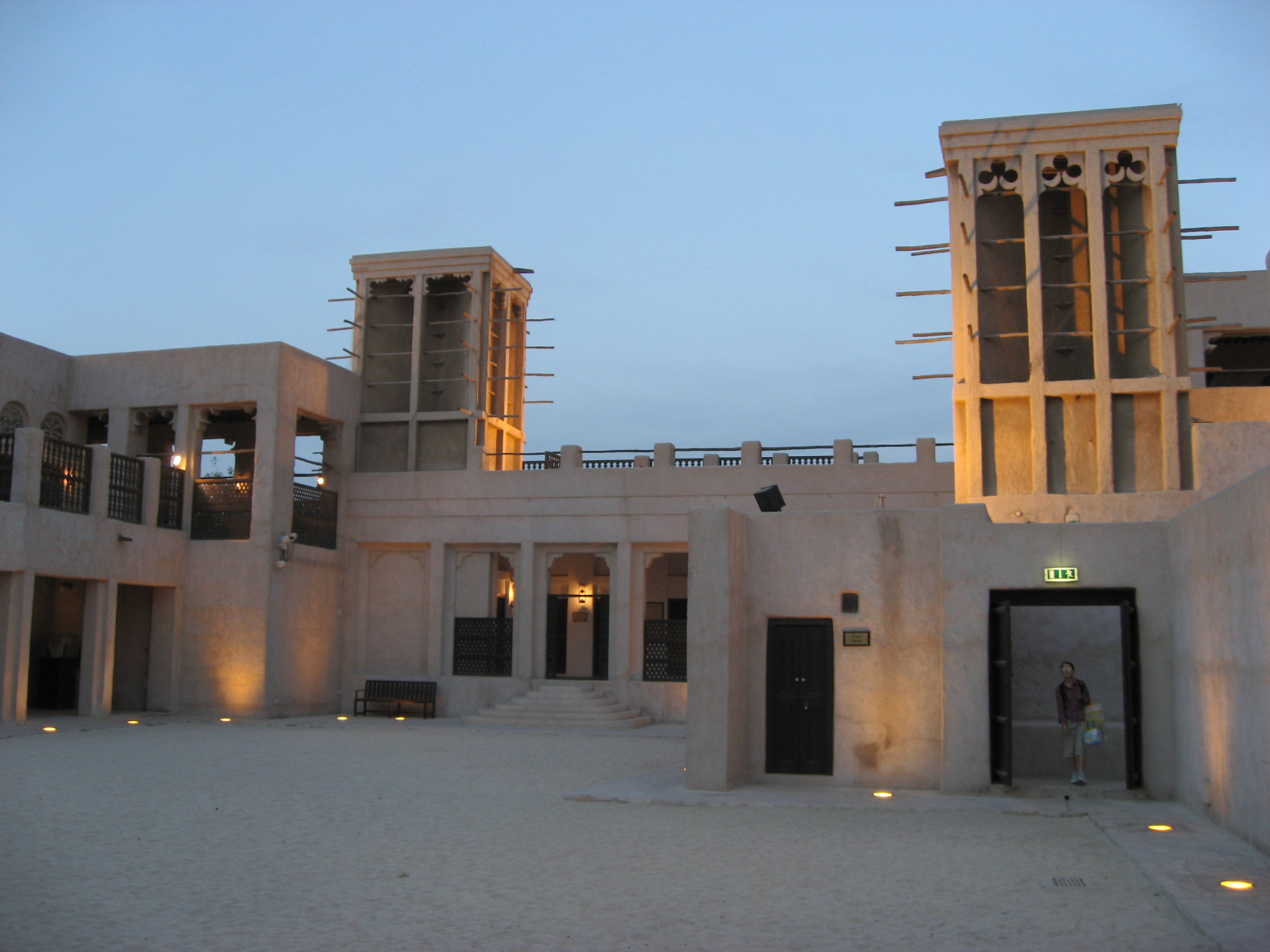
Sheikh Maktoum house courtyard featuring the common architecture of wind-catchers called Barjeel.

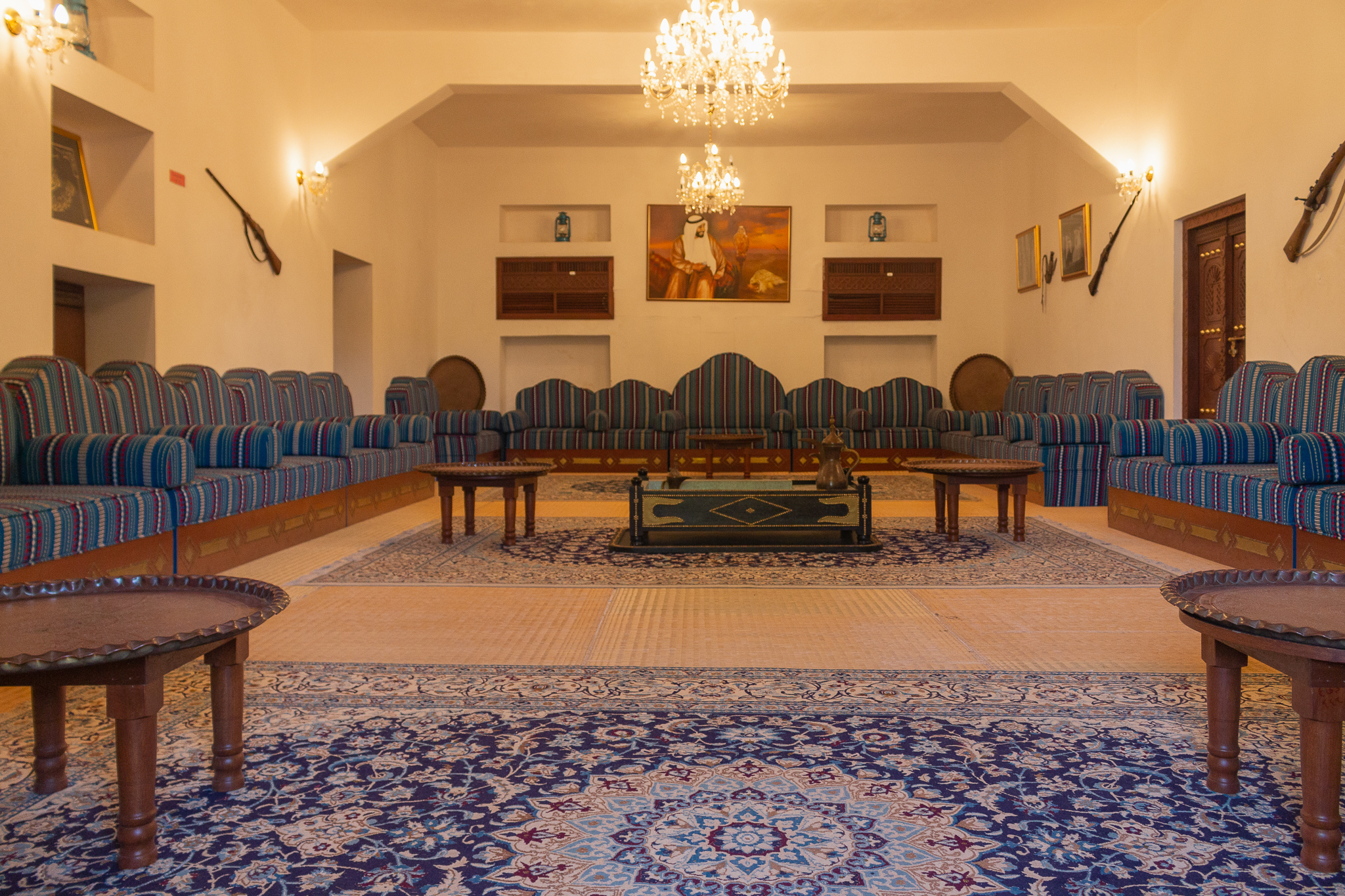
Majlis

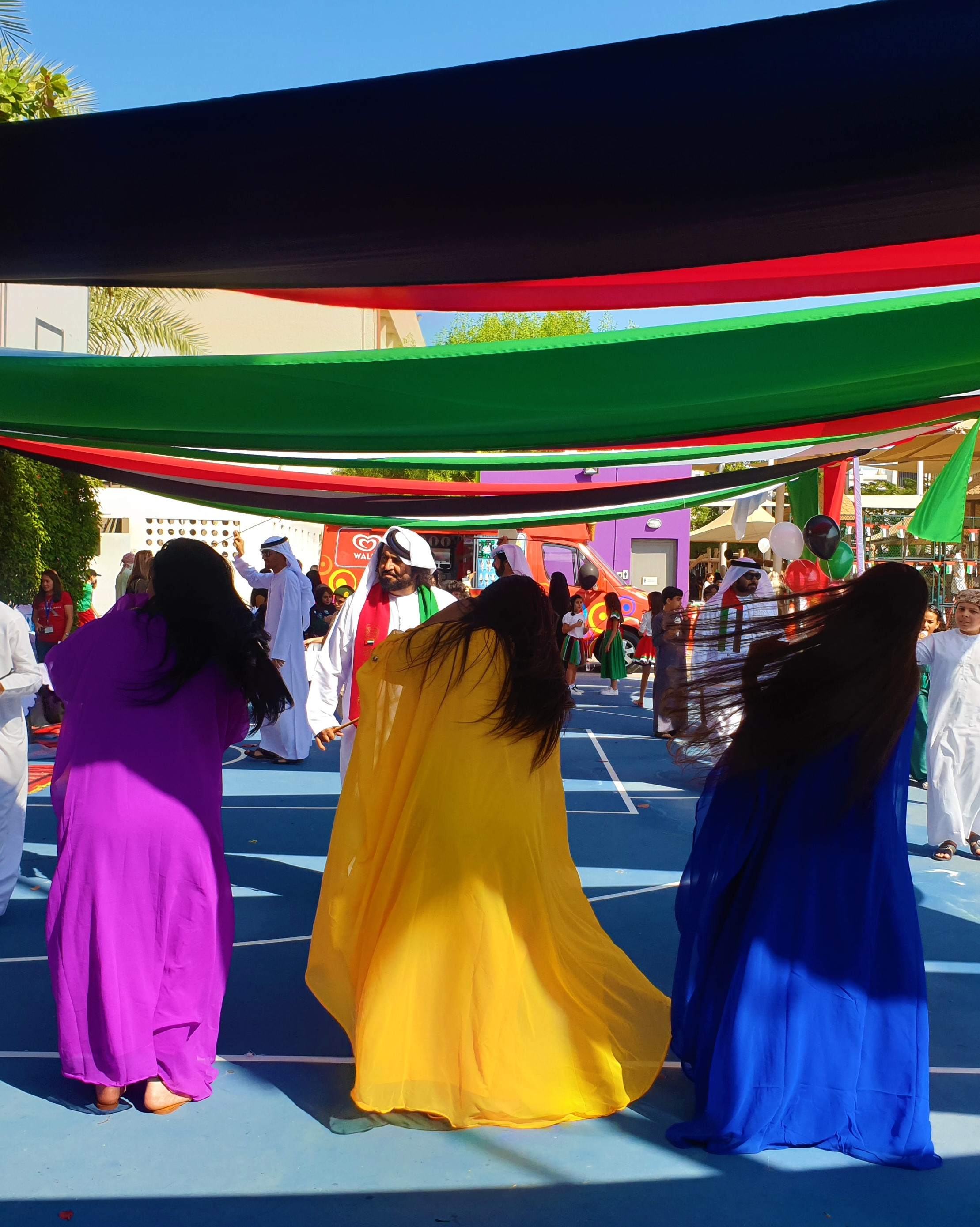
Women flip their hair sideways and wear brightly coloured traditional dress while performing an Emirati folk dance.
- Architecture of the United Arab Emirates
- Cuisine of the United Arab Emirates
- Languages of the United Arab Emirates
- Media in the United Arab Emirates
- Museums in the United Arab Emirates
- Music of the United Arab Emirates
- National symbols of the United Arab Emirates
  - Emblem of the United Arab Emirates
  - Flag of the United Arab Emirates
  - National anthem of the United Arab Emirates
- People of the United Arab Emirates
- Prostitution in the United Arab Emirates
- Public holidays in the United Arab Emirates
- Religion in the United Arab Emirates
  - Buddhism in the United Arab Emirates
  - Christianity in the United Arab Emirates
  - Hinduism in the United Arab Emirates
  - Islam in the United Arab Emirates
  - Judaism in the United Arab Emirates
  - Sikhism in the United Arab Emirates

=== Art in the United Arab Emirates ===
- Cinema of the United Arab Emirates
- Music of the United Arab Emirates
- Television in the United Arab Emirates

=== Sport in the United Arab Emirates ===
Sport in the United Arab Emirates

- Football in the United Arab Emirates

== Economy and infrastructure of the United Arab Emirates ==
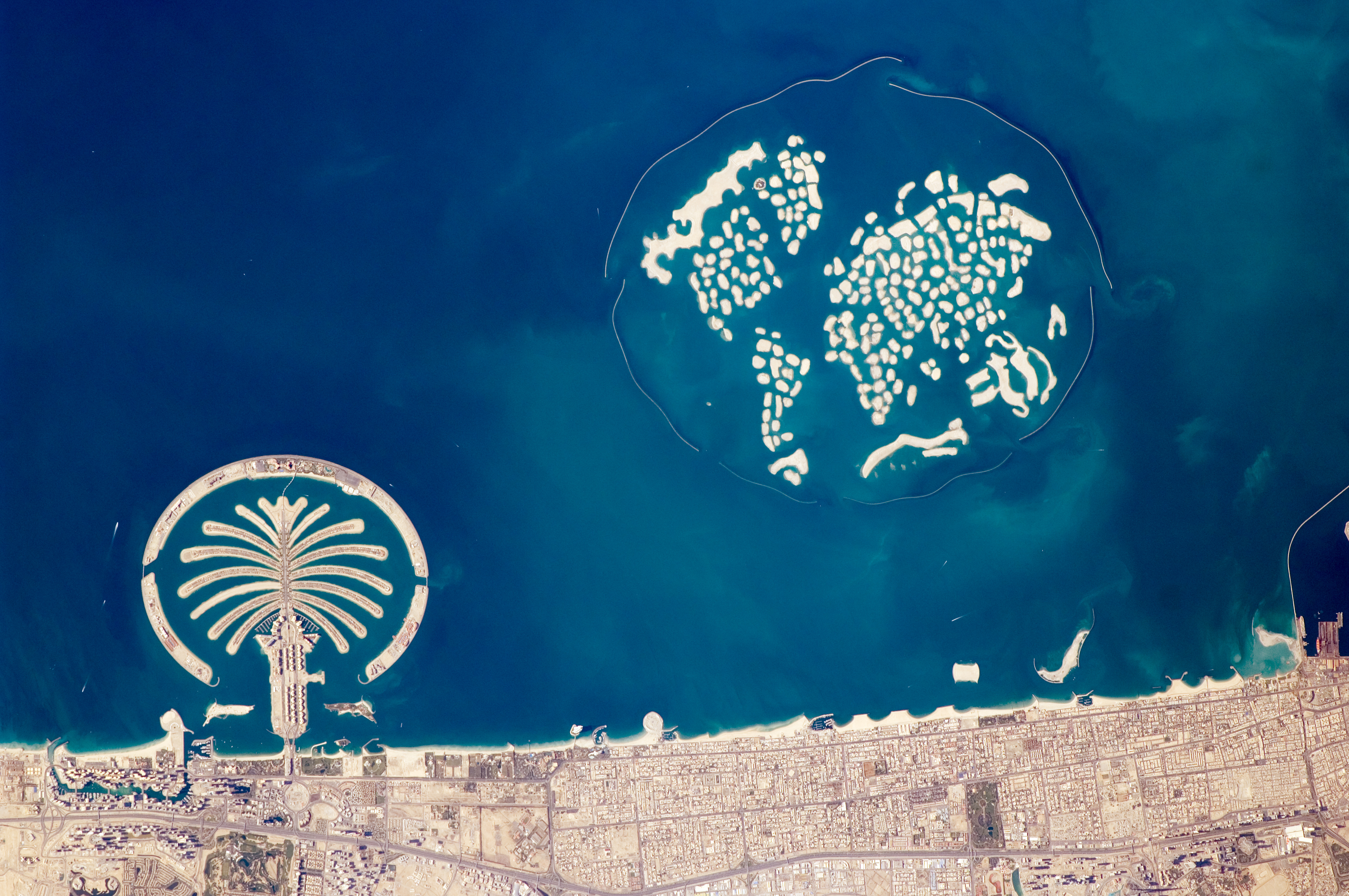
Archipelagoes in Dubai.

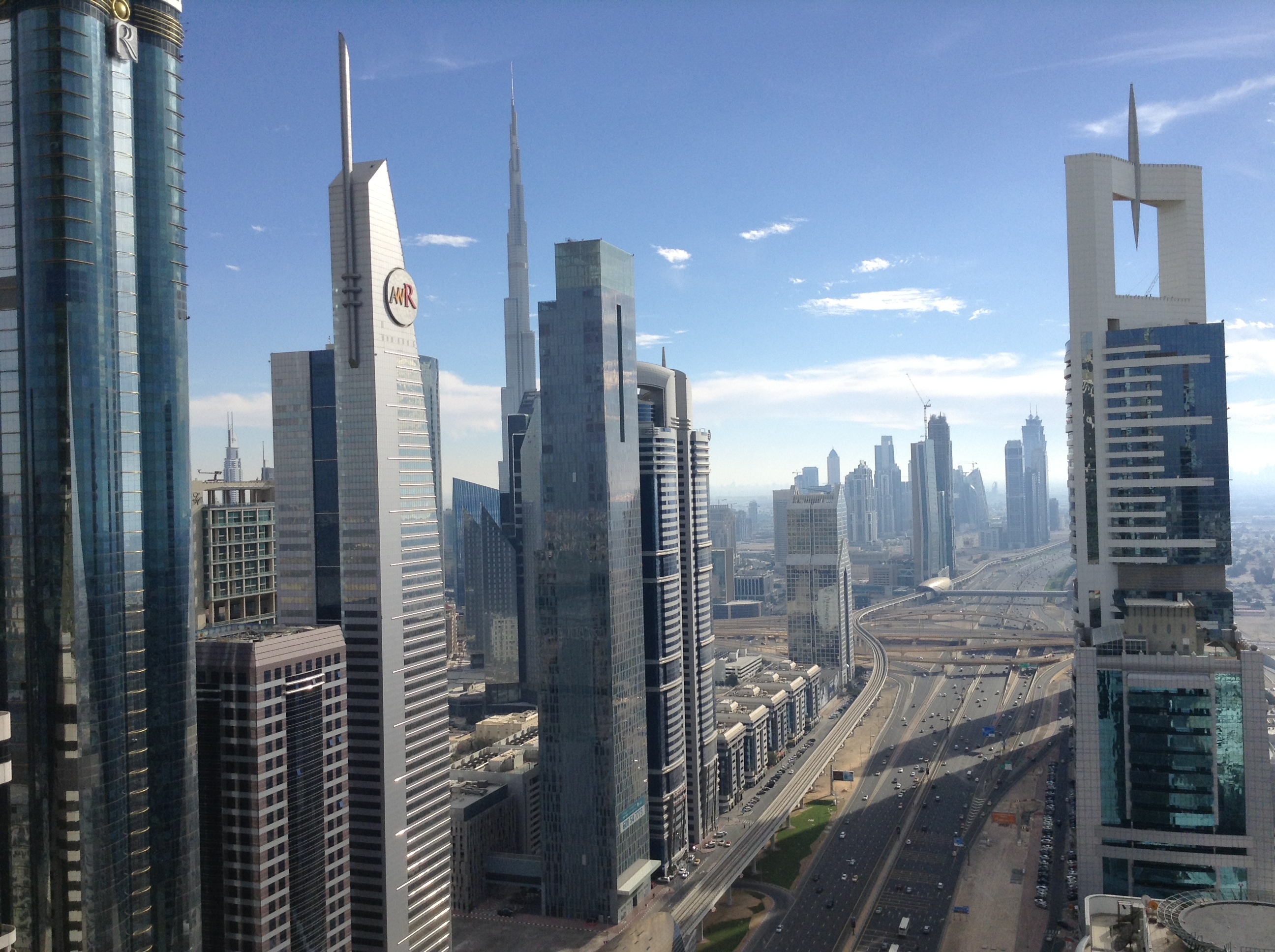
Dubai International Financial Center

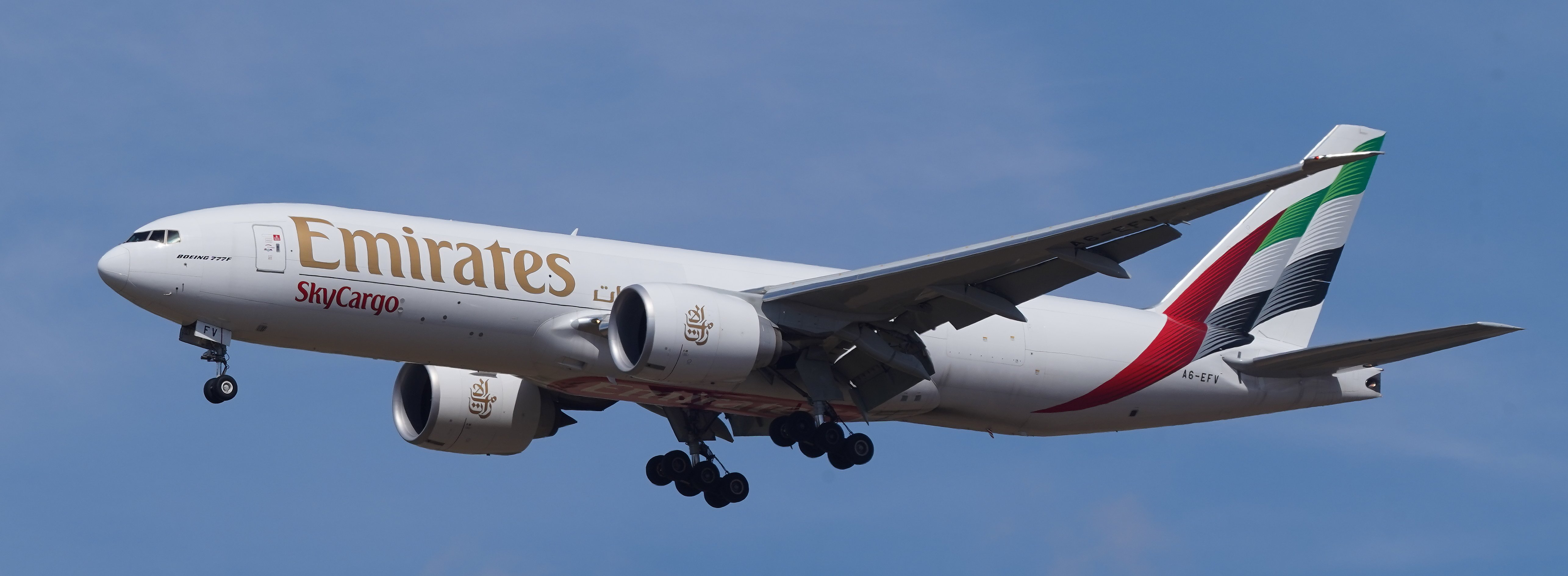
An Emirates SkyCargo Boeing 777F arriving at London Stansted Airport

Burj Khalifa
- Economic rank, by nominal GDP (2007): 37th (thirty-seventh)
- Agriculture in the United Arab Emirates
- Banking in the United Arab Emirates
- Communications in the United Arab Emirates
  - Internet in the United Arab Emirates
- Companies of the United Arab Emirates
- Currency of the United Arab Emirates: Dirham
  - ISO 4217: AED
- Energy in the United Arab Emirates
  - Nuclear power in the United Arab Emirates
- Health care in the United Arab Emirates
- Tourism in the United Arab Emirates
- Transport in the United Arab Emirates
  - Airports in the United Arab Emirates
  - Rail transport in the United Arab Emirates

== See also ==
United Arab Emirates

- Index of United Arab Emirates-related articles
- List of international rankings
- List of United Arab Emirates-related topics
- Member state of the United Nations
- Outline of Asia
- Outline of geography
