= Conscription in the United Arab Emirates =

Conscription in the United Arab Emirates, more commonly known as the National Service (Arabic: الخدمة الوطنية), is a mandatory national military service for all Emirati males aged between 18 and 30 for the duration of 11 months. The law is intended to bolster the United Arab Emirates defence capabilities and increase the military reserve force of the United Arab Emirates Armed Forces.

== History ==
The bill was approved by the Federal National Council (FNC) and became law in January 2014. Emirati men who have finished secondary school or aged between 18 and 30 will have to serve 11 months, while those who have not will serve three years. The service will be optional for women, who may be trained for nine months, regardless of their education. The law gives citizens who complete the mandatory military service a range of benefits, including priority for taking up jobs in government institutions and private businesses, marriage grants, housing plots and scholarships.

Citizens who fail to enlist for military service without valid reason until they reach 29 years of age will face a jail term of between one month and a year, or a fine ranging between AED 10,000 and 50,000 or both. They will have to undergo the military service even if they exceed the age limit of 30. Executive rules will spell out alternative services and security training where these services can be offered and terms for exemption from military service for medical or other reasons.

Military service may be completed at the UAE Armed Forces, the Ministry of Defense, the Ministry of Interior, the State Security Service and other institutions identified by the deputy supreme commander of the UAE Armed Forces. The reserves will consist of those who have completed their national service and military personnel who have finished .

The duration of the military service was initially 9 months and was later increased to 12 months. In July 2018, the duration was extended to 16 months. As of February 2024, the duration is 11 months.

== See also ==
- Military history of the United Arab Emirates
