= National symbols of the United Arab Emirates =

National symbols of the United Arab Emirates are the symbols used to represent the United Arab Emirates.

== Symbols of the United Arab Emirates ==
Title	Name of Symbol	Picture
National flag	Flag of the United Arab Emirates	
Anthem	National anthem of the United Arab Emirates	Īshī Bilādī
Emblem	Emblem of the United Arab Emirates	
Animal	Arabian oryx	
Bird	Falcon	
Tree	Ghaf	
