= List of mammals of the United Arab Emirates =

This is a list of the mammal species recorded in the United Arab Emirates. There are forty-one mammal species in the United Arab Emirates, of which five are endangered, five are vulnerable, and one is near threatened.

The following tags are used to highlight each species' conservation status as assessed by the International Union for Conservation of Nature:

EX	Extinct	No reasonable doubt that the last individual has died.
EW	Extinct in the wild	Known only to survive in captivity or as a naturalized populations well outside its previous range.
CR	Critically endangered	The species is in imminent risk of extinction in the wild.
EN	Endangered	The species is facing an extremely high risk of extinction in the wild.
VU	Vulnerable	The species is facing a high risk of extinction in the wild.
NT	Near threatened	The species does not meet any of the criteria that would categorise it as risking extinction but it is likely to do so in the future.
LC	Least concern	There are no current identifiable risks to the species.
DD	Data deficient	There is inadequate information to make an assessment of the risks to this species.

== Order: Hyracoidea (hyraxes) ==
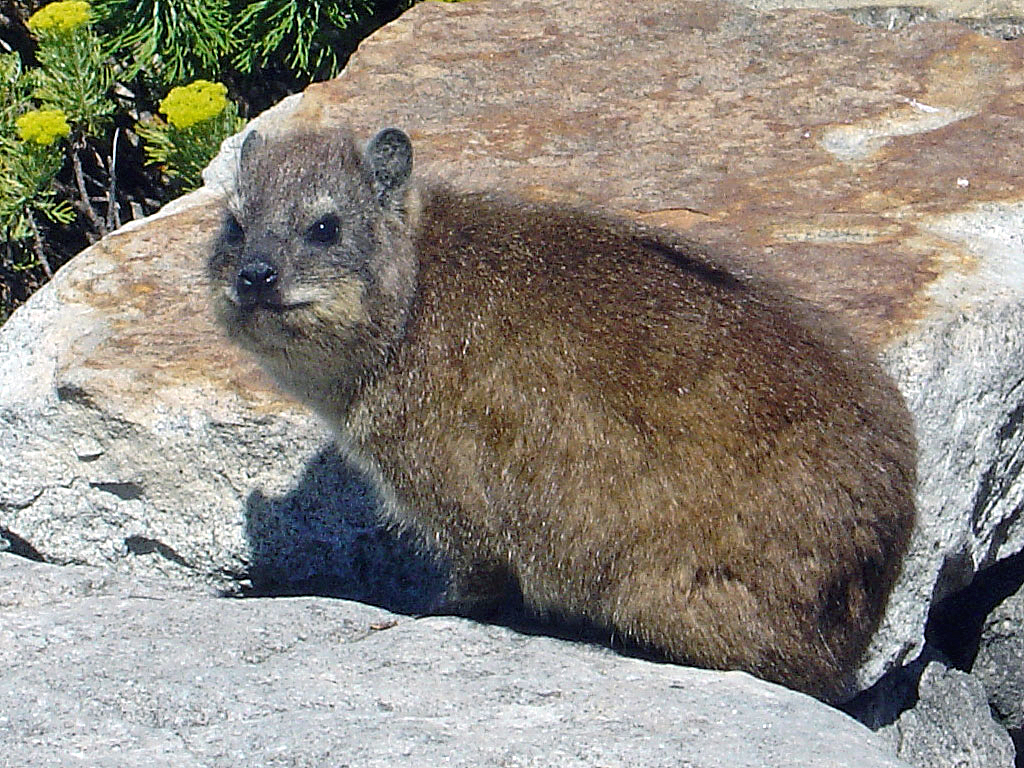
Cape hyrax

The hyraxes are any of four species of fairly small, thickset, herbivorous mammals in the order Hyracoidea. About the size of a domestic cat they are well-furred, with rounded bodies and a stumpy tail. They are native to Africa and the Middle East.

- Family: Procaviidae (hyraxes)
  - Genus: Procavia
    - Cape hyrax, P. capensis LC introduced on Sir Bani Yas

== Order: Sirenia (manatees and dugongs) ==
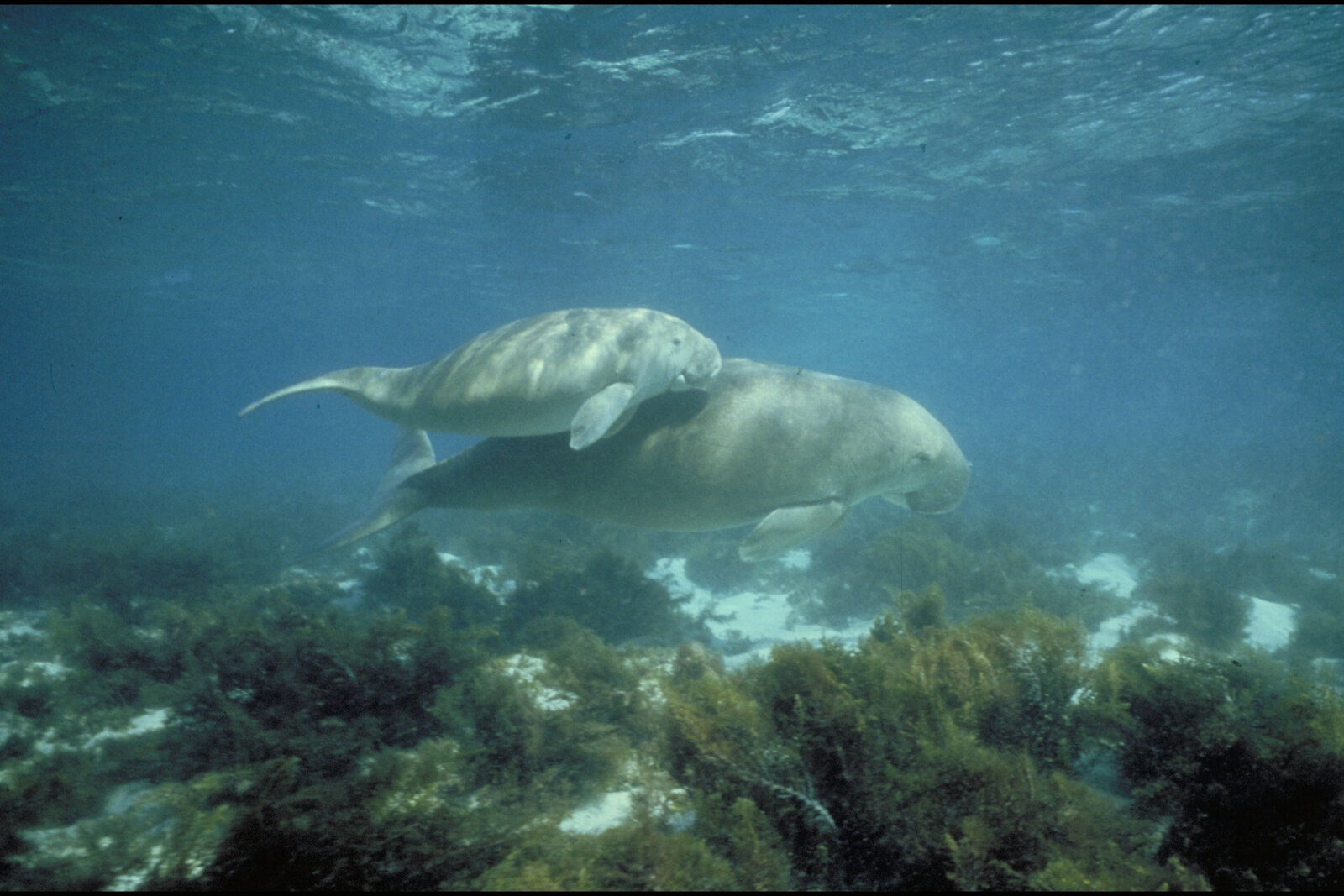
Dugongs

Sirenia is an order of fully aquatic, herbivorous mammals that inhabit rivers, estuaries, coastal marine waters, swamps, and marine wetlands. All four species are endangered.

- Family: Dugongidae
  - Genus: Dugong
    - Dugong, D. dugon VU

== Order: Rodentia (rodents) ==
Rodents make up the largest order of mammals, with over 40% of mammalian species. They have two incisors in the upper and lower jaw which grow continually and must be kept short by gnawing. Most rodents are small though the capybara can weigh up to 45 kg (99 lb).

- Suborder: Sciurognathi
  - Family: Dipodidae (jerboas)
    - Subfamily: Dipodinae
      - Genus: Jaculus
        - Lesser Egyptian jerboa, J. jaculus LC
- Suborder: Myomorpha
  - Family: Muridae (mice, rats, voles, gerbils, hamsters)
    - Subfamily: Gerbillinae
      - Genus: Gerbillus
        - Wagner's gerbil, G. dasyurus LC
        - Balochistan gerbil, G. nanus LC

== Order: Lagomorpha (lagomorphs) ==
Lagomorphs comprise rabbits, hares, and pikas. Unlike rodents; they have four incisors on their upper jaws.

- Family: Leporidae (rabbits and hares)
  - Genus: Lepus
    - Cape hare, L. capensis LC

== Order: Erinaceomorpha (hedgehogs and gymnures) ==
The order Erinaceomorpha contains a single family, Erinaceidae, which comprise the hedgehogs and gymnures. The hedgehogs are easily recognised by their spines while gymnures look more like large rats.

- Family: Erinaceidae (hedgehogs)
  - Subfamily: Erinaceinae
    - Genus: Paraechinus
      - Desert hedgehog, P. aethiopicus LC

== Order: Chiroptera (bats) ==
The bats' most distinguishing feature is that their forelimbs are developed as wings, making them the only mammals capable of flight. Bat species account for about 20% of all mammals.

- Family: Pteropodidae (flying foxes, Old World fruit bats)
  - Subfamily: Pteropodinae
    - Genus: Rousettus
      - Egyptian fruit bat, R. aegyptiacus LC
- Family: Vespertilionidae
  - Subfamily: Vespertilioninae
    - Genus: Eptesicus
      - Botta's serotine, E. bottae LC
    - Genus: Otonycteris
      - Desert long-eared bat, O. hemprichii LC
    - Genus: Pipistrellus
      - Kuhl's pipistrelle, P. kuhlii LC
    - Genus: Rhyneptesicus
      - Sind bat, R. nasutus LC
- Family: Rhinolophidae
  - Subfamily: Hipposiderinae
    - Genus: Asellia
      - Trident leaf-nosed bat, A. tridens LC
    - Genus: Triaenops
      - Persian trident bat, T. persicus LC
- Family: Rhinopomatidae
- Genus: Rhinopoma
    - Small mouse-tailed bat, R. muscatellum LC

== Order: Cetacea (whales) ==
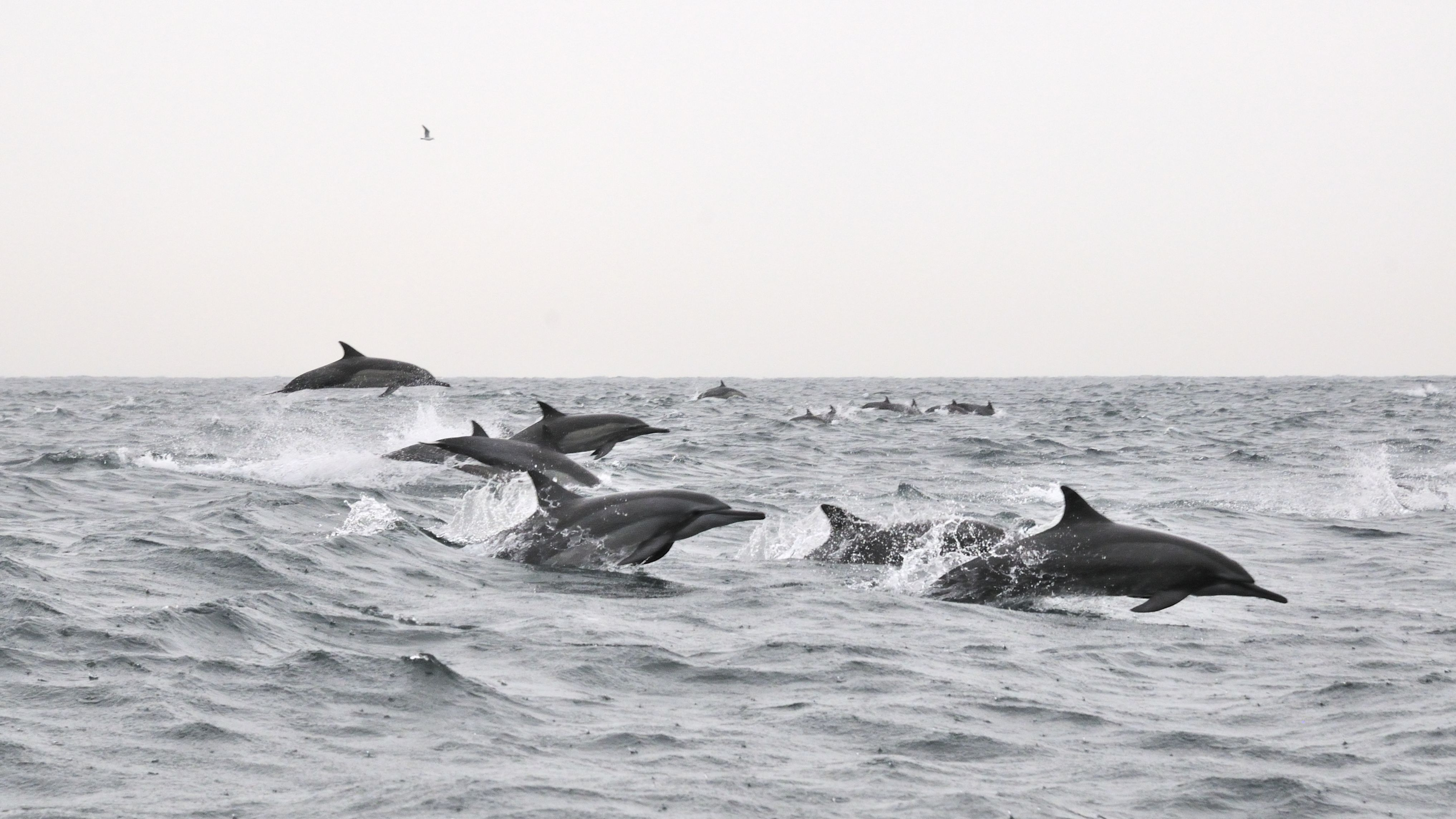
Spinner dolphins in Gulf of Oman

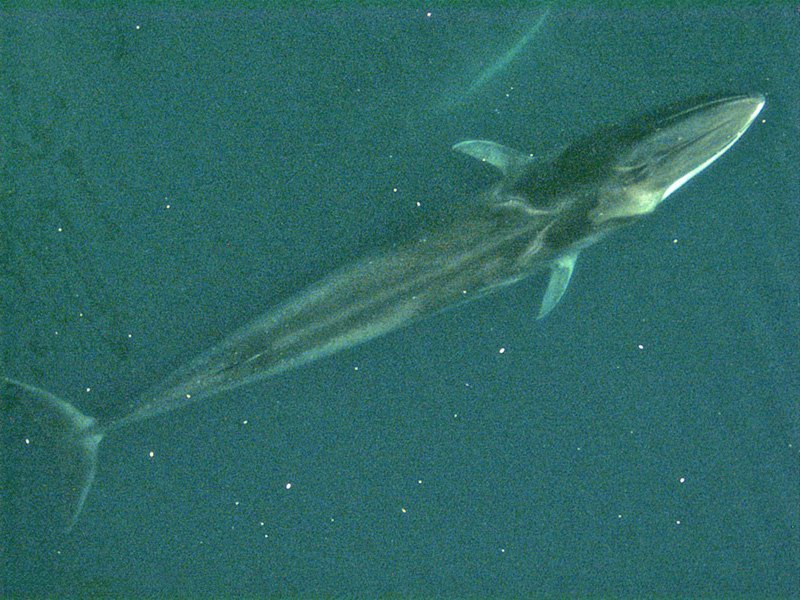
Fin whale

The order Cetacea includes whales, dolphins and porpoises. They are the mammals most fully adapted to aquatic life with a spindle-shaped nearly hairless body, protected by a thick layer of blubber, and forelimbs and tail modified to provide propulsion underwater.

- Suborder: Mysticeti
  - Family: Balaenopteridae
    - Subfamily: Balaenopterinae
      - Genus: Balaenoptera
        - Blue whale, Balaenoptera musculus EN
        - Fin whale, Balaenoptera physalus EN
        - Bryde's whale, Balaenoptera brydei DD
        - Minke whale, Balaenoptera acutorostrata nt
  - Subfamily: Megapterinae
    - Genus: Megaptera
      - Humpback whale, M. novaeangliae LC
- Suborder: Odontoceti
  - Family Physeteridae (sperm whales)
    - Genus: Physeter
      - Sperm whale, Physeter catodon
  - Superfamily: Platanistoidea
    - Family: Phocoenidae
      - Genus: Neophocaena
        - Finless porpoise, Neophocaena phocaenoides DD
    - Family: Delphinidae (marine dolphins)
      - Genus: Delphinus
        - Long-beaked common dolphin, Delphinus capensis
      - Genus: Sousa
        - Chinese white dolphin, Sousa chinensis DD (Gulf waters of Abu Dhabi holds world's largest population)
      - Genus: Tursiops
        - Bottlenose dolphin, Tursiops aduncus DD
      - Genus: Stenella
        - Spinner dolphin, Stenella longirostris LC
      - Genus: Grampus
        - Risso's dolphin, Grampus griseus DD
      - Genus: Pseudorca
        - False killer whale, Pseudorca crassidens DD
      - Genus: Orcinus
        - Killer whale, Orcinus orca DD

== Order: Carnivora (carnivorans) ==
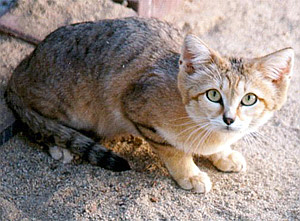
Sand cat

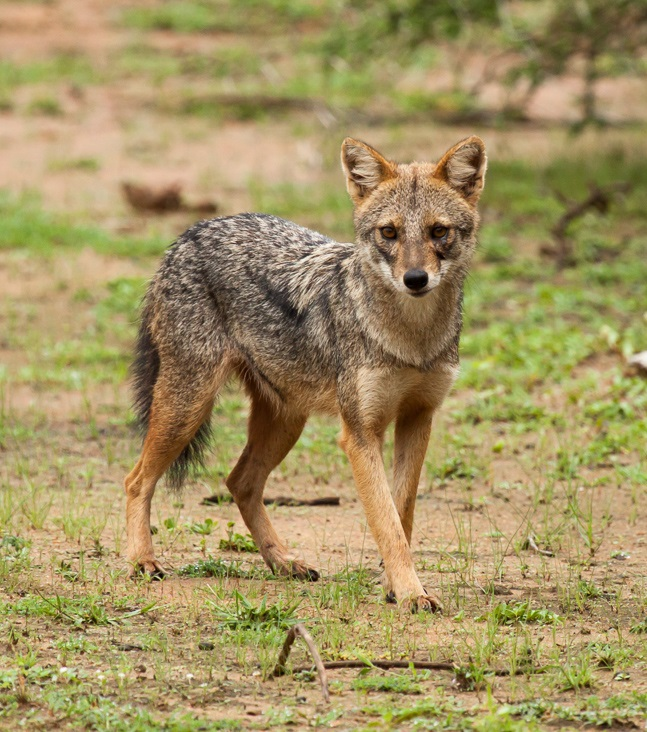
Golden jackal

There are over 260 species of carnivorans, the majority of which eat meat as their primary dietary item. They have a characteristic skull shape and dentition.

- Family: Felidae (cats)
  - Subfamily: Felinae
    - Genus: Acinonyx
      - Cheetah, A. jubatus VU
    - Genus: Caracal
      - Caracal, C. caracal LC
    - Genus: Felis
        - African wildcat, F. lybica LC
      - Sand cat, F. margarita LC
- Family: Herpestidae (mongooses)
  - Subfamily: Herpestinae
    - Genus: Urva
      - Indian grey mongoose, U. edwardsii LC
    - Genus: Ichneumia
      - White-tailed mongoose, I. albacauda LC
- Family: Hyaenidae (hyaenas)
  - Genus: Hyaena
    - Striped hyena, H. hyaena NT
- Family: Canidae (dogs, foxes)
  - Genus: Vulpes
    - Blanford's fox, V. cana LC
    - Rüppell's fox, V. rueppellii LC
    - Red fox, V. vulpes LC
  - Genus: Canis
    - Golden jackal, C. aureus LC
    - Gray wolf, C. lupus LC
      - Arabian wolf, C. l. arabs
- Family: Mustelidae (mustelids)
  - Genus: Mellivora
    - Honey badger, M. capensis LC

== Order: Artiodactyla (even-toed ungulates) ==
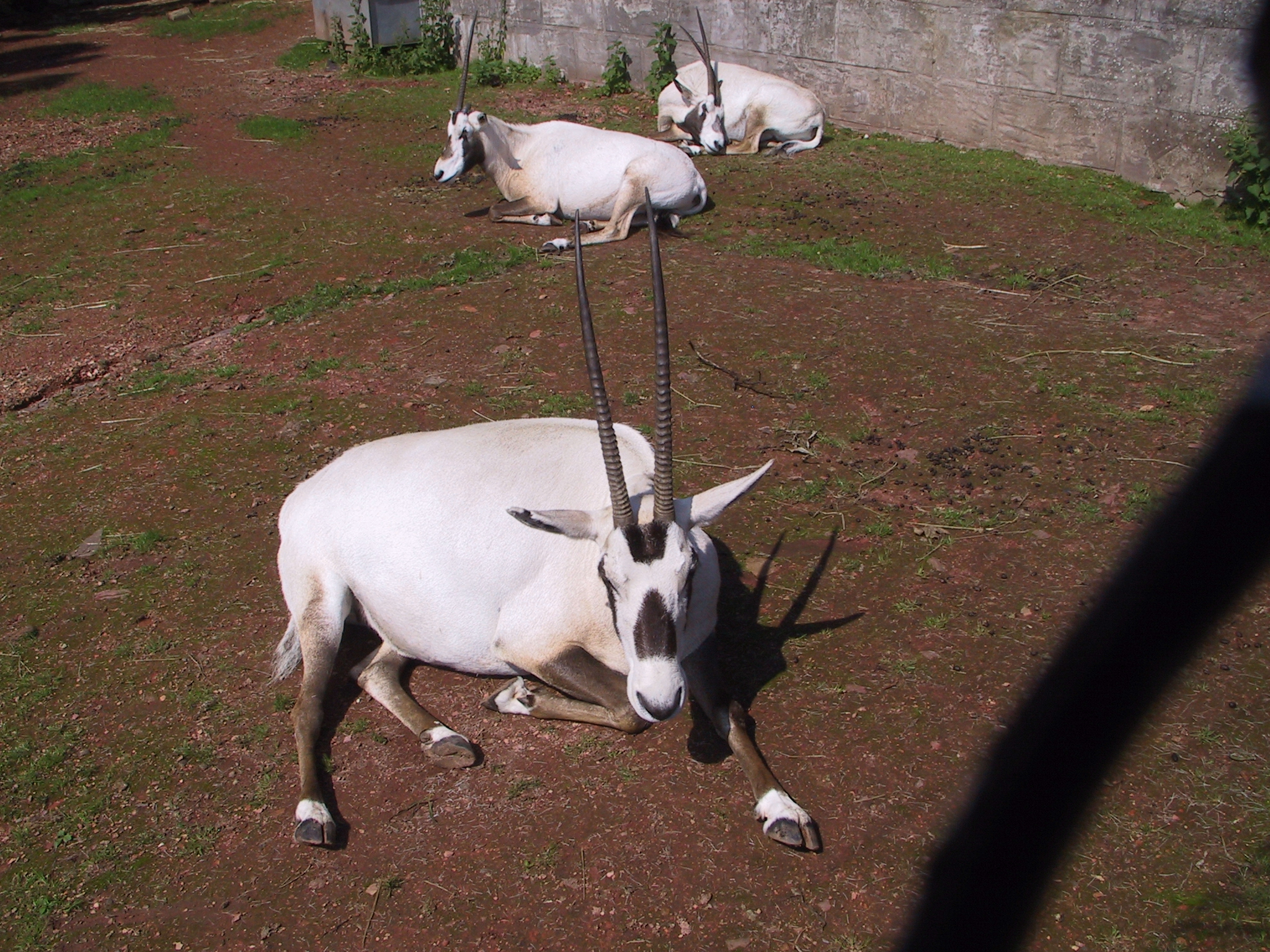
Arabian oryx

The even-toed ungulates are ungulates whose weight is borne about equally by the third and fourth toes, rather than mostly or entirely by the third as in perissodactyls. There are about 220 artiodactyl species, including many that are of great economic importance to humans.

- Family: Bovidae (cattle, antelope, sheep, goats)
  - Subfamily: Antilopinae
    - Genus: Antilope
      - Blackbuck, A. cervicapra LC introduced on Sir Bani Yas
    - Genus: Gazella
      - Arabian gazelle, G. arabica VU
      - Arabian sand gazelle, G. marica VU
  - Subfamily: Caprinae
    - Genus: Ammotragus
      - Barbary sheep, A. lervia VU introduced on Sir Bani Yas
    - Genus: Arabitragus
      - Arabian tahr, A. jayakari EN
  - Subfamily: Hippotraginae
    - Genus: Oryx
      - Arabian oryx, O. leucoryx VU reintroduced
      - Gemsbok, O. gazella LC introduced on Sir Bani Yas
      - Scimitar oryx, O. gazella EW introduced on Sir Bani Yas
    - Genus: Taurotragus
      - Common eland, T. oryx LC introduced on Sir Bani Yas
- Family: Cervidae (deer)
  - Subfamily: Cervinae
    - Genus: Axis
      - Chital, A. axis LC introduced on Sir Bani Yas
    - Genus: Cervus
      - Red deer, C. elaphus LC introduced on Sir Bani Yas
- Family: Giraffidae
  - Genus: Giraffa
    - Reticulated giraffe, G. reticulata EN introduced on Sir Bani Yas

== Locally extinct ==
- Leopard, Panthera pardus

== See also ==
- Wildlife of the United Arab Emirates
- List of chordate orders
- Lists of mammals by region
- List of prehistoric mammals
- Mammal classification
- List of mammals described in the 2000s
