= Emirati =

Emirati may refer to:

- pertaining to the country of United Arab Emirates
- the people of the United Arab Emirates, see Emiratis
- Emirati culture
