= International rankings of the United Arab Emirates =

The following are links to international rankings of the United Arab Emirates.

== General rankings ==
Rankings
Name	Year	Place	Out of #	Reference
CIA World Factbook – Population Density	2013	142nd	238	
CIA World Factbook – GDP per capita (PPP)	2008	19th	229	
CIA World Factbook – life expectancy	2008	70th	223	
World Economic Forum – Enabling Trade Index ranking	2008	18th	118	
Yale University / Columbia University - Environmental Performance Index	2008	112th	149	
The Economist Intelligence Unit - e-readiness	2008	35th	70	
The Economist Intelligence Unit - Global Peace Index	2008	42nd	140	
United States Patent and Trademark Office's list of patents by country	2007	68th	172	
Wall Street Journal / The Heritage Foundation - Index of Economic Freedom	2007	54th	157	^{[unfit]}
United Nations - Human Development Index	2008	31st	179	
World Economic Forum - Global Competitiveness Report 2007-2008	2007	37th	131	
World Economic Forum - The Global Gender Gap Report 2007	2007	105th	128	
World Bank - Ease of Doing Business Index	2007	46th	178	
Reporters Without Borders - Worldwide Press Freedom Index	2007	69th	169	
Transparency International - Corruption Perceptions Index	2008	35th	180	
The Economist Intelligence Unit - Index of Democracy	2007	150th	167	
New Economics Foundation - Happy Planet Index	2006	123rd	178	
The Economist Intelligence Unit - Quality-of-life index	2005	69th	111	
Save the Children - % seats in the national government held by women	2008	39th	177	

== International rankings ==
Organization	Survey	Ranking
Institute for Economics and Peace	Global Peace Index	41 out of 144
United Nations Development Programme	Human Development Index	35 out of 182
Transparency International	Corruption Perceptions Index	30 out of 180
World Economic Forum	Global Competitiveness Report	23 out of 133
Pyramid Research	Mobile Telephony Market Penetration	1st of top 10
International Diabetes Federation	Diabetes Prevalence	2 out of 223
World Intellectual Property Organization	Global Innovation Index, 2026	25 out of 139
