= Prostitution in the United Arab Emirates =

Prostitution in the United Arab Emirates is illegal. Punishments for engaging in prostitution include heavy fines and imprisonment, with foreign prostitutes typically being deported from the UAE. In 2006 the UAE deported 4,300 foreign prostitutes. Despite its illegality, prostitution is widespread, especially in Dubai and Abu Dhabi. The authorities generally turn a blind eye provided it is kept out of the public eye.

UAE nationals are permitted a number of residence visas. These are mainly used for domestic staff, but any surplus are often sold through middlemen to prostitutes to enter and remain in the country for two years. Residence visas may change hands at upwards of £5,000. And, "agents arrange for prostitutes to enter the country on a 30-day tourist visa.

Although there is street prostitution, notably Hamdan Street in Abu Dhabi, most prostitution takes place in the bars and nightclubs of hotels.

== Dubai ==
During the era of slavery, prostitution was connected to slavery. The Islamic Law formally prohibited prostitution. However, since the principle of concubinage in Islam in Islamic Law allowed a man to have intercourse with his female slave, prostitution was practiced by a pimp selling his female slave on the slave market to a client, who was allowed to have intercourse with her as her new owner, and who after intercourse returned his ownership of her to her pimp on the pretext of discontent, which was a legal and accepted method for prostitution in the Islamic world. Slavery in Dubai was however abolished in 1963.

Sex trade in Dubai has been prevalent for many years. In 1936, Sheikh Saeed's wali forced the prostitutes to get married or to leave. During the 1950s and 1960s, two madams controlled the Persian prostitutes. One controlled the red-light district in Bur Dubai, the other around Nasser Square (now Baniyas Square). Sheikh Rashid ordered that all the prostitutes were rounded up and deported. This caused a run on the local British bank when the women tried to draw out all their savings.

Modern Dubai is one of the main centres of prostitution in the UAE and is dubbed "Sodom-sur-Mer". Prostitutes frequent the bars and nightclubs in the hotels. Many prostitutes from poorer countries, such as Nigeria, come to work in Dubai for a short while and then return home with their earnings.

Prostitution, although prohibited, is prevalent and easily accessible in Dubai. Women engaged in this business operate in brothels or massage establishments situated in the city's red-light areas. However, it is not only women, but also men who offer their services in the city. Typically, red-light districts are located in the city's more established areas, such as Deira and Bur Dubai.

There are also brothels in Dubai. The Cyclone, near the airport was closed down in 2007 after it was featured in Vanity Fair magazine, but the operation simply set up at another location. Known by visitors as the "United Nations of prostitution", the club has as many as 500 prostitutes on the premises on an average night, many from China, Azerbaijan, Kazakhstan, Kyrgyzstan, Tajikistan, Uzbekistan, Russia, Ukraine, Bulgaria and Taiwan.

The Cyclone appeared in the 2008 Leonardo DiCaprio and Russell Crowe film Body of Lies.

Human trafficking is a problem in Dubai, often Chinese or other Asian criminal groups force women from India or Nepal into prostitution in UAE. There are many Iranian prostitutes in Dubai and some of them stay in the city for a long time. In 2014, Iranian Immigration & Passport Police Office announced that the number of Iranian prostitutes in the UAE is growing.

Over the years, Dubai emerged as an influencer capital of the world, where the social media influencers used their popularity to depict the city’s extravagance. However, on the dark side of influencer marketing culture in Dubai were several influencers who had been funding their lifestyle by selling sex for thousands of dirhams. Influencers get direct messages from men on Instagram, respond to them and agree to meet. Men pay them with flights, jewellery, bags and cash. Besides, interviews revealed that influencers with more followers are paid more.

In 2025, the BBC released a documentary titled Death in Dubai, which exposed the exploitation of African women through prostitution rings in Dubai. Many of these women travel to the UAE with hopes of securing work in supermarkets or hotels, but instead find themselves coerced into sexual activities at wild parties. According to testimonies, these women were unable to get assistance from the Dubai police, who refused to intervene and dismissed the issue, claiming that Africans were causing problems for each other. The documentary also uncovered the disturbing reality behind the #Dubaiportapotty trend, which led to the tragic death of a Ugandan woman.

== Sex tourism ==
The UAE attracts many foreign businessmen as it is gaining a reputation as the Middle East's top sex tourism destination. Many of them arrive regularly from the post-Soviet states, South America, Eastern Europe, East Asia, Africa, South Asia, and other states of the Middle East.

== Sex trafficking ==
In 2007, the United States State Department placed the United Arab Emirates as a "Tier 2" in its annual Trafficking in Persons reports, meaning that it does not fully comply with the minimum standards for the elimination of trafficking but is making significant efforts to do so. The UAE is a destination and transit country for women subjected to sex trafficking. Some women, predominantly from Central, South and Southeast Asia, Eastern Europe, East Africa, Iraq, Iran, and Morocco, are subjected to forced prostitution in the UAE. In 2016, 22 cases related to sex trafficking were brought before the courts.

== Policy against sex trafficking ==
The National Committee to Combat Human Trafficking, which was created in 2012, is in charge of combating human trafficking in the UAE. This committee coordinates both national and international actions to tackle trafficking in line with international frameworks, such as the United Nations Convention Against Transnational Organized Crime and its Protocol to Prevent, Suppress and Punish Trafficking in Persons, especially for women and children. A milestone in the UAE's anti-trafficking policy was the introduction of Federal Decree-Law No. 24 of 2023, which amended Federal Law No. 51 of 2006. This updated legal framework clearly defines human trafficking as any act involving the recruitment, transportation, or exploitation of individuals through force, fraud, or abuse of power for purposes such as sexual exploitation, forced labor, slavery, or organ trafficking. In addition to broadening the definition of human trafficking, this legislation enforces strict penalties on traffickers, including a minimum five-year prison sentence and substantial fines.

== Policy against sexual offenses and prostitution ==
In 2025, the UAE issued a federal decree-law amending the Crimes and Penalties Law, tightening penalties for sexual offenses involving minors and prostitution. The penalties include a minimum of 10 years’ imprisonment for adults who engage in sexual relations with persons under 18. Offenses involving incitement or solicitation for prostitution carry at least two years’ imprisonment. In addition, the amendment empowers courts to assess the risk posed by convicted sexual offenders before the end of their sentences.
