= Military history of the United Arab Emirates =

The military history of the United Arab Emirates describes the military history of the United Arab Emirates Armed Forces. Prior to the union of the emirates, different tribal confederations formed the de facto military force which was dominant in the area now known as the United Arab Emirates. The Bani Yas and Al Qawasim were the most significant of those tribal confederations. The official formation of the military began with the formation of the Truical Oman Levies by the British Empire on 11 May 1951 as the area was under a British protectorate.

The Trucial Oman Levies, later renamed the Trucial Oman Scouts, were for a long time the symbol of public order in eastern Arabia and was commanded by British officers. The force was turned over to the United Arab Emirates as its defense forces when the British residency in the Persian Gulf ended and the United Arab Emirates formed in 1971. Prior to the unification of the armed forces, each emirate of the United Arab Emirates was responsible for its own defence. Three major defence forces were formed: the Abu Dhabi Defence Force, Dubai Defence Force, and Ras Al Khaimah Mobile Force. The three later united to form the Federal Defence Force on 6 May 1976 and hence, the United Arab Emirates Armed Forces.

The UAE's armed forces have engaged in numerous conflicts and war zones since their inception. The UAE Armed Forces were deployed in the Gulf War, Kosovo War, United Nations Operation in Somalia II, War in Afghanistan, enforcing UNSC Resolution 1973 in the 2011 Libyan Civil War, 2014 military intervention against ISIS in Syria, and the Saudi-led intervention in Yemen.

== Bani Yas and Qawasim ==
Prior to the union of the emirates, different tribal confederations formed the de facto military force which was dominant in the area now known as the United Arab Emirates. The Bani Yas and Al Qawasim were the most significant of those tribal confederations. The Al Qawasim were a major maritime force in the region, which prompted the British Royal Navy to organize several campaigns, such as Persian Gulf campaign of 1809 and Persian Gulf campaign of 1819 and the deployment of ground forces in Ras Al Khaimah to control the trade routes the Al Qawasim dominated. With the signing of the 1820 General Maritime Treaty between the British and the tribal sheikhs and the commencement of the British Residency of the Persian Gulf, the British Empire with the assistance of Sheikh Khalid III bin Muhammad al-Qasimi endeavored to form a unified paramilitary force based in Sharjah to suppress the slave trade and prevent tribal conflicts. The paramilitary force was named the Trucial Oman Levies.

== Trucial Oman Scouts ==
The current United Arab Emirates military was formed from the historical Trucial Oman Levies which was established on 11 May 1951. The Trucial Oman Levies, which were renamed the Trucial Oman Scouts in 1956, were a locally raised, British commanded force long considered a symbol of public order in Eastern Arabia.

The duties of the TOL as of 1951 were to (1) maintain peace and good order on the Trucial States; (2) prevent or suppress any traffic of slaves (but not slavery itself as this was considered an 'internal affair' by the British); and (3) provide an escort for any British political representative traveling in the Trucial States. Their duties were later expanded to include helping maintain law and order and preventing internal tribal conflicts from interfering with the work of oil companies seeking to explore for oil under concessions agreed with the Rulers. The Rulers of the Trucial States were not consulted regarding the formation or establishment of the force and only the Ruler of Sharjah, who rented out the base to be used by the Levies on a 10-year lease, was informed of their establishment.

The Trucial Oman Scouts were turned over to the United Arab Emirates as the nucleus of its defense forces in 1971 with the formation of the UAE and were absorbed into the newly formed united military called the Union Defence Force (UDF). The Union Defence Force was established officially as the military of the United Arab Emirates on 27 December 1971 from a directive issued by the UAE's founding father and first president, Sheikh Zayed bin Sultan Al Nahyan.

== Union Defence Force and unification ==
As the Union Defence Force, every emirate was responsible for the equipment and training of its own defence forces. In the event of an attack on any one of the seven emirates, the Union Defence Force would be mobilized from every emirate to defend the attacked emirate. In 1974 the name was changed to the Federal Armed Forces. On 6 May 1976, the Federal Armed Forces were unified as a single body. This was considered a historic event and a large milestone in the military of the United Arab Emirates. May 6 is celebrated annually as the Military Union Day. As a result of the union of forces, the number of personnel formed a brigade and was referred to as the Yarmouk Brigade.

After the union of the armed forces in 1976, the Yarmouk Brigade was officially renamed the United Arab Emirates Armed Forces. The three largest emirates defence forces which originally formed the Federal Armed Forces, Abu Dhabi Defence Force, Dubai Defence Force, and Ras Al Khaimah Mobile Force, were converted into three major military bases/zones for the United Arab Emirates Armed Forces. In 1976 the official UAE Armed Forces insignia, uniform, military academies, army, air force, and naval force were established and the military General Headquarters (GHQ) was formed in the capital Abu Dhabi.

Although initially small in number, the UAE armed forces have grown significantly over the years and are presently equipped with some of the most modern weapon systems, purchased from a variety of outside countries, mainly France, the US and the UK. Most officers are graduates of the United Kingdom's Royal Military Academy at Sandhurst, with others having attended the United States Military Academy at West Point, the Royal Military College, Duntroon, and St Cyr, the military academy of France.

=== Commemoration day ===
The date of the first death in the line of duty of an Emirati soldier was on 30 November 1971 during the Seizure of Abu Musa and the Greater and Lesser Tunbs as is celebrated annually as the Commemoration Day. The highest loss of life in the history of the UAE military occurred on Friday 4 September 2015, in which 52 soldiers were killed in Marib area of central Yemen by a Tochka missile which targeted a weapons cache and caused a large explosion. All the names of Emirati soldiers who died in the line of duty are inscribed in the UAE Armed Forces memorial, the Oasis of Dignity, in the capital Abu Dhabi.

== Deployments ==
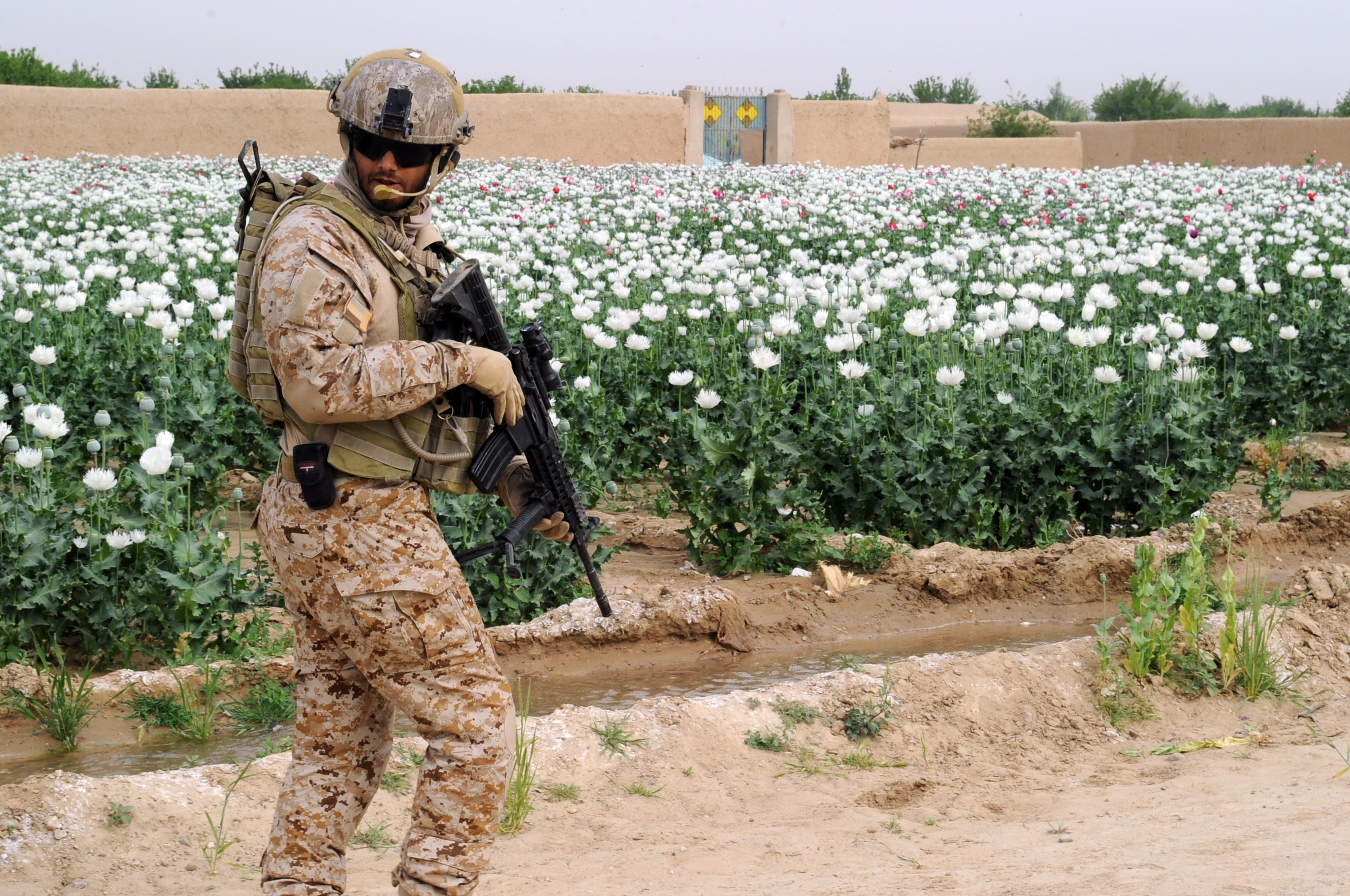
A UAE Armed Forces Special Ops soldier assigned to Special Operations Task Force-West, patrols villages in Afghanistan on 7 April 2011.

The United Arab Emirates Armed Forces participated in multiple conflicts, mostly in the Middle East. From 1977 to 1979 the UAE Army contributed 750 men to the Arab Deterrent Force peacekeeping mission in Lebanon. During 1990–1991, the Armed Forces participated in the first Gulf War. 10 Emirati soldiers lost their lives in liberating Kuwait. The UAE Armed Forces were also deployed in Eastern Europe and joined NATO's Kosovo Force peacekeeping mission undertaking aid missions to thousands of fleeing refugees on the Albanian border. This was the first time Emirati troops uniform was switched to the woodland camouflage compared to their regular home desert camouflage. The UAE Armed Forces also participated in the peacekeeping mission in Somalia from 1993 to 1994. The UAE Armed Forces is also the only Arab country to commit troops to maintain security and participate in humanitarian aid missions to Afghanistan. The Emirati special Forces, the Presidential Guards, were deployed to maintain security in War in Afghanistan against the Taliban. In March 2011, the UAE joined the enforcement of the no-fly-zone over Libya by sending six F-16 and six Mirage 2000 multi-role fighter aircraft and in 2015 the UAE joined the Saudi-led coalition intervention in Yemen by sending 30 UAEAF F16 Desert Falcons to Yemen. The intervention was followed by Emirati ground troops deployment in Southern Yemen mainly focusing on targeting terrorist cells such as the Al-Qaeda in the Arabian Peninsula and the Islamic State.

== Conscription ==
The UAE introduced a mandatory military conscription for adult males in 2014. The national service duration is for 11 months and is intended to bolster the United Arab Emirates military reserve force.

== See also ==
- History of the United Arab Emirates
- The Evolution of the Armed Forces of the United Arab Emirates by Athol Yates
