= Ishi Biladi =

National anthem of the United Arab Emirates

ʿĪshī Bilādī
English: Long Live my Country
- عيشي بلادي
- National anthem of the United Arab Emirates
- Lyrics: Arif Sheikh Abdullah Hassan, 1986
- Music: Saad Abdel Wahab or Mohammed Abdel Wahab, 1971
- Adopted: 1971; 1986 (with lyrics)

Audio sample
- U.S. Navy Band instrumental rendition in F major: file; help

"ʿĪshī Bilādī" (Note: Arabic: عيشي بلادي, lit. 'Long Live my Country'; IPA: [ˈʕɪːʃiː biˈlaːdiː]) (/ˈɪʃi bɪˈlɑːdi/ ISH-ee bil-AHD-ee) is the national anthem of the United Arab Emirates. It was officially accepted as the national anthem after the formation of the country in December 1971.

== History and use ==
It is not clear whether it was the Egyptian composer Saad Abdel Wahab or his uncle, Egyptian composer Alhan Ahammed, who created the melody for the anthem in 1971. The anthem did not have lyrics until 1986, which were written by Arif Al Sheikh.

== Lyrics ==
Arabic original

عِيشِي بِلَادِي عَاشْ اِتِّحَادُ إِمَارَاتِنَا
عِشْتِ لِشَعْبٍ دِينُهُ الْإِسْلَامُ هَدْيُهُ الْقُرْآنُ
حَصَّنْتُكَ بِاسْمِ اللَّٰه يَا وَطَنْ

بِلَادِي بِلَادِي بِلَادِي بِلَادِي
حَمَاكِ الْإِلَٰهُ شُرُورَ الزَّمَانْ
أَقْسَمْنَا أَنْ نَبْنِيَ نَعْمَلْ
نَعْمَلْ نُخْلِصْ نَعْمَلْ نُخْلِصْ
مَهْمَا عِشْنَا نُخْلِصْ نُخْلِصْ

دَامَ الْأَمَانُ وَعَاشَ الْعَلَمْ يَا إِمَارَاتِنَا
رَمْزَ الْعُرُوبَةِ كُلُّنَا نَفْدِيكِ بِالدِّمَاء نَرْوِيكِ
نَفْدِيكَ بِالْأَرْوَاحْ يَا وَطَنْ

MSA romanization

ʿĪšī bilādī ʿāš ittiḥādu ʾimārātinā
ʿIšti li-šaʿbin dīnuhu l-ʾislāmu haddyuhu l-qurʾānu
Ḥaṣṣantuka bismillah yā waṭan

Bilādī bilādī bilādī bilādī
Ḥamāki-lʾilāhu šurūra z-zamān
ʾAqsamnā ʾan nabniya naʿmal
Naʿmal nuxliṣ naʿmal nuxliṣ
Mahmā ʿišnā nuxliṣ nuxliṣ

Dām al-ʾamānu wa-ʿāš al-ʿalam yā ʾimārātinā
Ramz al-ʿurūbati kullunā nafdīki bi-d-dimāʾ narwīki
Nafdīka bi-l-ʾarwāḥ yā waṭan

IPA transcription (Note: See Help:IPA/Arabic and Gulf Arabic.)

[ʕɪː.ʃiː bi.læː.diː ʕɑːʃ æt.tɪ.ħæː.du ʔi.mɑː.rɑː.ti.næː]
[ʕɪʃ.ti li.ʃɑʕ.bɪn diː.nu.hʊ‿l.ʔɪs.læː.mu hædː.ju.hʊ‿l.qʊr.ʔɑː.nu]
[ħɑsˁ.sˁɑn.tu.kæ bɪs.mɪl.læh jæː wɑ.tˁɑn]

[bi.læː.diː bi.læː.diː bi.læː.diː bi.læː.diː]
[ħɑ.mæː.kɪ‿l.ʔi.læː.hu ʃʊ.ruː.rɑ‿z.zæ.mæːn]
[ʔɑq.sæm.næː ʔæn næb.ni.jæ nɑʕ.mæl]
[nɑʕ.mæl nʊx.lɪsˁ nɑʕ.mæl nʊx.lɪsˁ]
[mæh.mæː ʕɪʃ.næː nʊx.lɪsˁ nʊx.lɪsˁ]

[dæːm æl.ʔæ.mæː.nu wɑ ʕɑːʃ æl.ʕɑ.læm jæː ʔi.mɑː.rɑː.ti.næː]
[rɑmz æl.ʕʊ.ruː.bæ.ti kʊl.lu.næː næf.diː.ki bɪd.di.mæːʔ nɑr.wiː.ki]
[næf.diː.kæ bɪl.ʔɑr.wɑːħ jæː wɑ.tˁɑn]

English translation

Long live my country, the unity of our Emirates lives.
You've lived for the nation's faith of Islam and guide of the Quran.
I've made you stronger in God's name – oh, homeland.

My country, my country, my country, my country.
God protected you from the evils of time.
We have sworn to build and work –
work earnestly, work earnestly.
As long as we live, we will be sincere.

The safety has lasted, the flag has lived – oh, our Emirates!
The symbol of Arabism: we all sacrifice and shed blood for you;
For you we sacrifice with our souls – oh, homeland!
