= United Arab Emirates Armed Forces =

Military of the United Arab Emirates

- القوات المسلحة لدولة الإمارات العربية المتحدة (Arabic)
- Seal of the Armed Forces

- Flag of the Armed Forces
- Founded: May 11, 1951; 75 years ago (Note: With the establishment of the Trucial Oman Levies.)
- Current form: May 6, 1976
- Service branches: UAE Army; UAE Navy; UAE Air Force; UAE Presidential Guard; UAE Joint Aviation Command
- Headquarters: Abu Dhabi
- Website: Ministry of Defence

Leadership
- Commander-in-Chief: Mohammed bin Zayed Al Nahyan
- Prime Minister: Mohammed bin Rashid Al Maktoum
- Minister of Defence: Hamdan bin Mohammed Al Maktoum
- Chief of Staff: Lieutenant General Issa Saif bin Ablan Al Mazrouei
- Deputy Chief of Staff: Major General Ahmed bin Tahnoun Al Nahyan

Personnel
- Military age: 18–30 years (male recruits); 18–35 years (female volunteers)
- Conscription: 11 months for eligible male citizens with secondary education; three years without secondary education
- Active personnel: 65,000 (2024 estimate)
- Reserve personnel: 130,000 (2024 estimate)

Industry
- Domestic suppliers: Edge Group; Caracal International LLC; NIMR Automotive LLC; Abu Dhabi Ship Building
- Foreign suppliers: United States; France; South Korea; Russia; United Kingdom; Italy; Germany; Israel

Related articles
- History: Military history of the United Arab Emirates
- Ranks: Military ranks of United Arab Emirates

The United Arab Emirates Armed Forces (Arabic: القوات المسلحة لدولة الإمارات العربية المتحدة, romanized: Al-Quwwāt al-Musallaḥa li-Dawlat al-ʾImārāt al-ʿArabīyyah al-Muttaḥidah) are the military forces of the United Arab Emirates. Their principal components include the Army, Navy, Air Force and Air Defence, and Presidential Guard. The UAE Joint Aviation Command also forms part of the country's military structure. The separately established National Guard Command coordinates with the armed forces and other federal security bodies.

The modern federal military was unified on 6 May 1976, having developed from the Trucial Oman Levies established in 1951. The Armed Forces have participated in international operations, including the Gulf War, Kosovo Force peacekeeping activities, the war in Afghanistan and the war in Yemen. In 2026, the UAE's air defence forces engaged Iranian missiles and drones launched towards the country during the 2026 Iran war.

Former United States Marine Corps general Jim Mattis nicknamed the UAE military Little Sparta in recognition of its military activity and regional role relative to the country's size.

== History ==
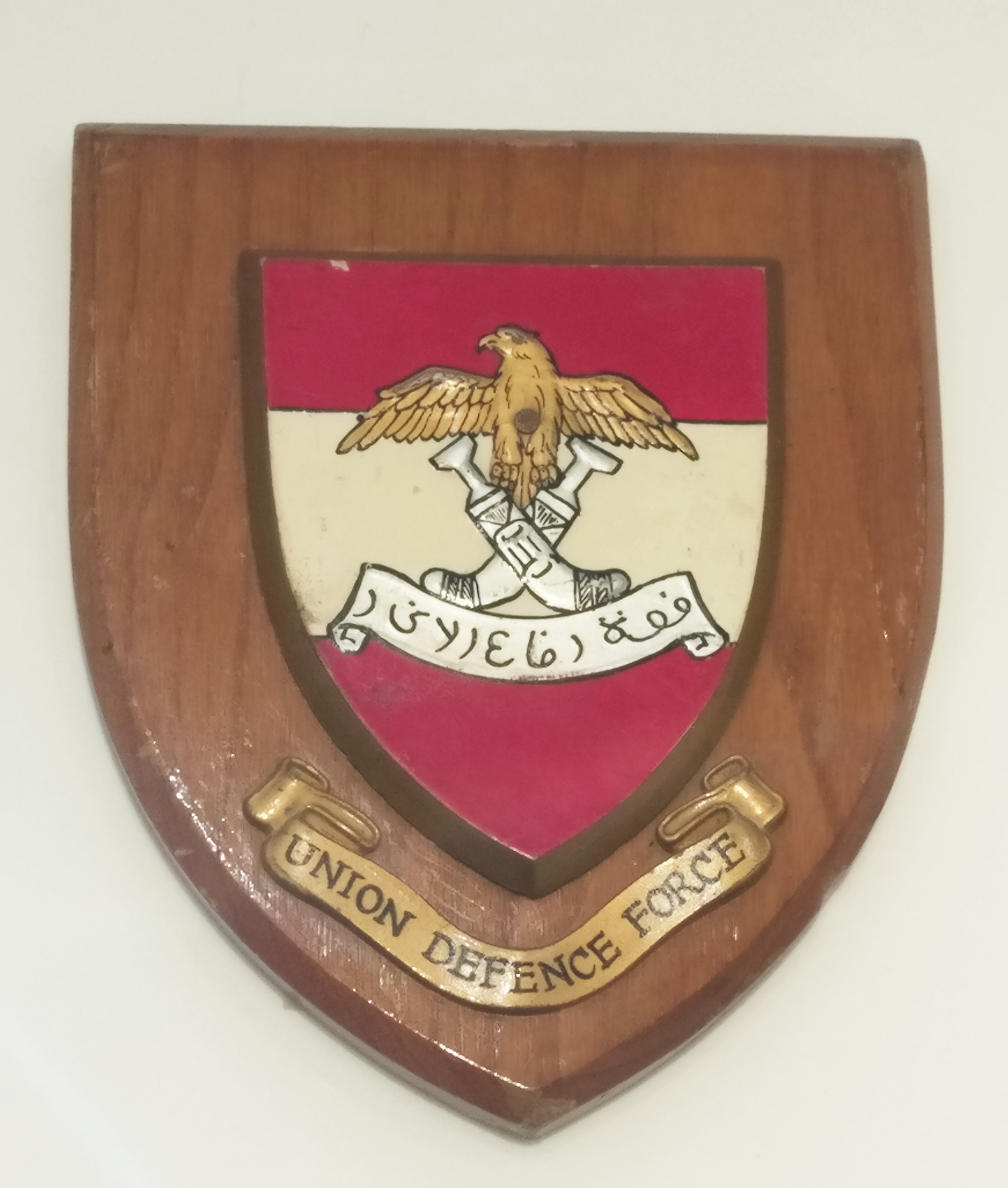
A falcon was added to the original Trucial Oman Levies insignia to signify the union of the emirates and formation of a force.

The United Arab Emirates military was formed from the Trucial Oman Levies, which was established on 11 May 1951 and was renamed the Trucial Oman Scouts in 1956. The Trucial Oman Scouts was turned over to the United Arab Emirates as the nucleus of its defense forces in 1971 with the formation of UAE and was absorbed into a united military called the Union Defence Force (UDF). The Union Defence Force was established officially as the military of the United Arab Emirates on 27 December 1971 from a directive issued by Zayed bin Sultan Al Nahyan.

In 1974, the name was changed to the Federal Armed Forces. On 6 May 1976, the Federal Armed Forces were unified as a single body. May 6 is celebrated annually as the Military Union Day. As a result of the union of forces, the number of personnel formed a brigade and were referred to as the Yarmouk Brigade. After the union of the armed forces in 1976, the Yarmouk Brigade was officially renamed the United Arab Emirates Armed Forces. In 1976 the official UAE Armed Forces insignia, uniform, military academies, air force, and naval force were established and the military General Headquarters (GHQ) was formed in Abu Dhabi. The UAE Armed Forces have incorporated Western military expertise into their development and modernization since 1965.

The United Arab Emirates Armed Forces participated in multiple conflicts, including those in the Middle East. From 1977 to 1979, the UAE Army contributed 750 men to the Arab Deterrent Force peacekeeping mission in Lebanon. During 1990–1991, the Armed Forces participated in the Gulf War. UAE Armed Forces were deployed in Eastern Europe and joined NATO's Kosovo Force peacekeeping mission, undertaking aid missions to thousands of fleeing refugees on the Albanian border. This was the first time the UAE troops' uniform was switched to the woodland camouflage compared to their home desert camouflage. UAE Armed Forces participated in the peacekeeping mission in Somalia from 1993-94. The UAE Presidential Guards were deployed to maintain security in war in Afghanistan against the Taliban. In March 2011, UAE joined the enforcement of the no-fly-zone over Libya by sending six F-16 and six Mirage 2000 multi-role fighter aircraft and in 2015 joined the Saudi-led coalition intervention in Yemen by sending 30 UAEAF F-16 "Desert Falcons" to Yemen. The intervention was followed by UAE ground troops in Southern Yemen, focusing on targeting Al-Qaeda in the Arabian Peninsula and Islamic State.

The UAE introduced compulsory national service for male Emirati citizens in 2014 and extended the service period to 16 months in 2018. Under a 2022 amendment, the standard service period for eligible male citizens with a high school diploma or higher qualification was reduced to 11 months; it is three years for those without a high school qualification. National service is voluntary for women, with an 11-month term.

The first UAE military death in the line of duty occurred on 30 November 1971 during the Seizure of Abu Musa and the Greater and Lesser Tunbs, a date commemorated annually as Commemoration Day. On 4 September 2015, a Tochka missile struck an ammunition depot near Ma'rib in Yemen, killing dozens of UAE military personnel, in the Armed Forces' deadliest single incident of the Yemen intervention. Names of those who died in service are commemorated at Wahat Al Karama, the national memorial in Abu Dhabi, inaugurated in 2016.

== Branches ==
=== Army ===
The United Arab Emirates Army, also referred to as the Land Forces, conducts ground operations and supports joint military missions. The force operates armoured vehicles including Leclerc tanks and BMP-3 infantry fighting vehicles. It includes combat-support and medical units.

=== Navy ===
The United Arab Emirates Navy is responsible for maritime defence and securing the country's territorial waters. The force has expanded from a predominantly coastal fleet to operate modern corvettes and offshore patrol vessels. The Navy commissioned the Al Emarat (P111), its second Bani Yas-class Gowind corvette, in February 2025, following the addition of Bani Yas (P110).

The UAE maintained a marine battalion until 2011, when it was incorporated into the Presidential Guard. The United Arab Emirates Coast Guard carries out maritime law-enforcement, border-control and rescue duties.

=== Air Force ===
The United Arab Emirates Air Force and Air Defence operate F-16E/F Block 60 and Mirage 2000-9 fighter aircraft, alongside transport, refuelling and airborne early-warning aircraft. In December 2021, the UAE ordered 80 Dassault Rafale F4 multirole aircraft from France. The first UAE-configured aircraft was presented in France in January 2025 and retained at Dassault Aviation's test centre for flight testing; initial deliveries to the UAE were scheduled for late 2026.

The country's ground-based air defence network includes American MIM-104 Patriot and Terminal High Altitude Area Defense systems and South Korean Cheongung-II medium-range air defence systems. The Cheongung-II systems entered combat during the Iranian missile and drone attacks of 2026; the International Institute for Strategic Studies reported that two Cheongung-II batteries were in UAE service by mid-March 2026.

=== Presidential Guard ===
The United Arab Emirates Presidential Guard was established in 2011 by merging the Amiri Guard, Special Operations Command and the Marine Battalion of the UAE Navy. The UAE subsequently requested training assistance from the United States Marine Corps. The U.S. State Department approved a foreign military sales (FMS) Training Case for UAE-PG in October 2011. Marine Corps Training Mission UAE (MCTM-UAE) operates under chief of mission authority as a Title 22 FMS training case.

== Deployments ==
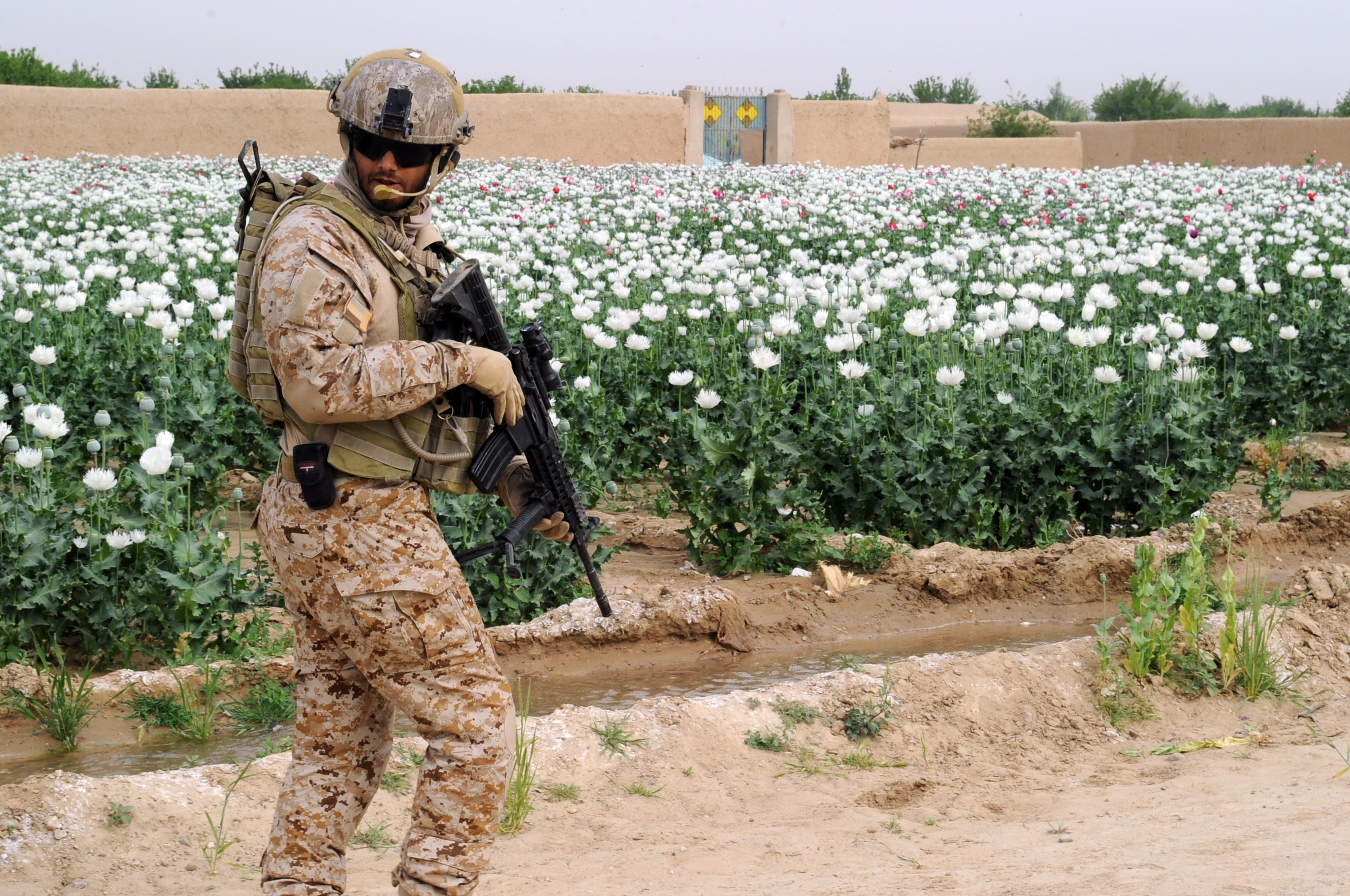
A UAE Armed Forces Special Ops soldier assigned to Special Operations Task Force-West patrols villages in Afghanistan on 7 April 2011.

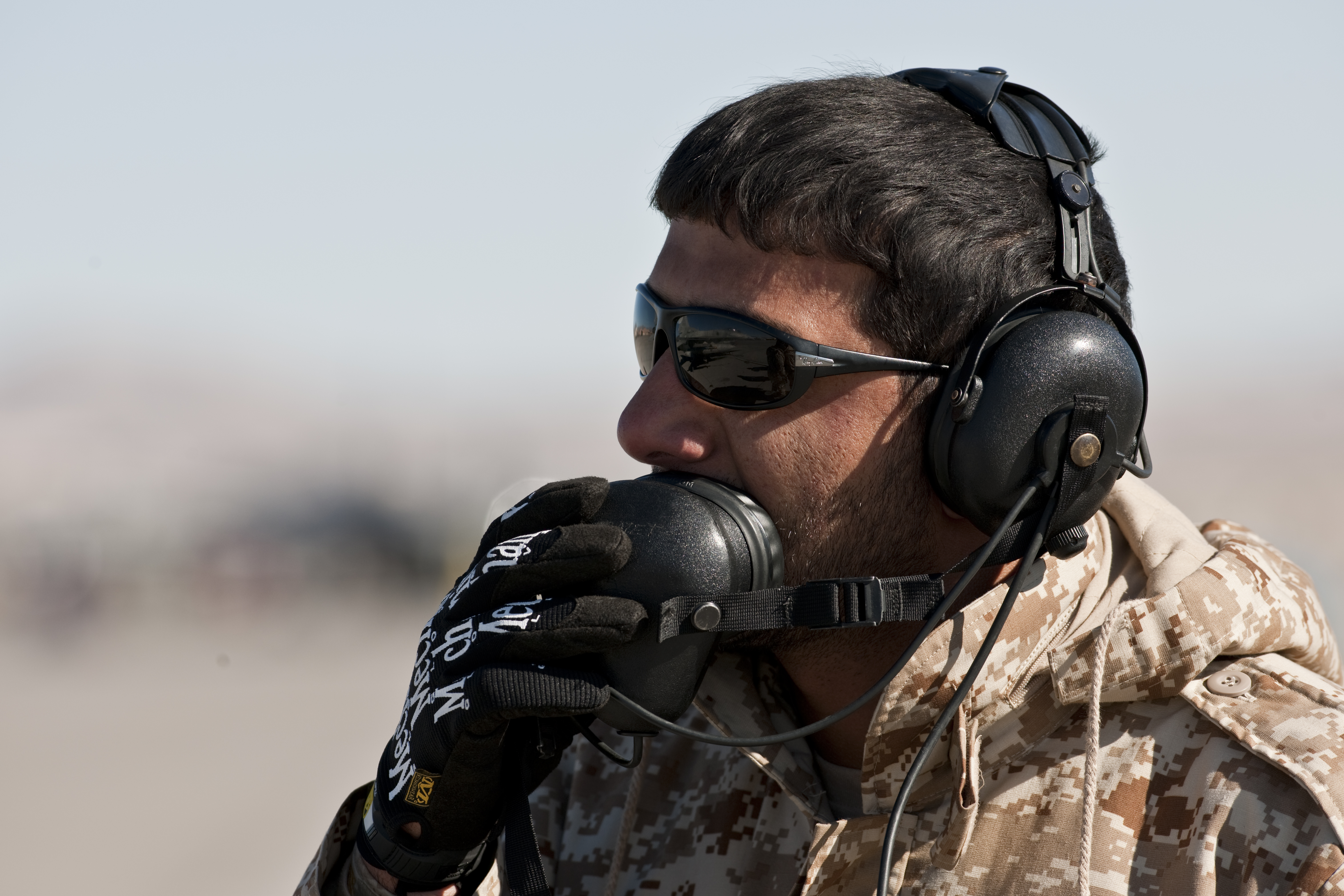
UAEAF crew chief communicating during an engine test at Nellis Air Force Base during Red Flag 11-2 on 2 February 2011

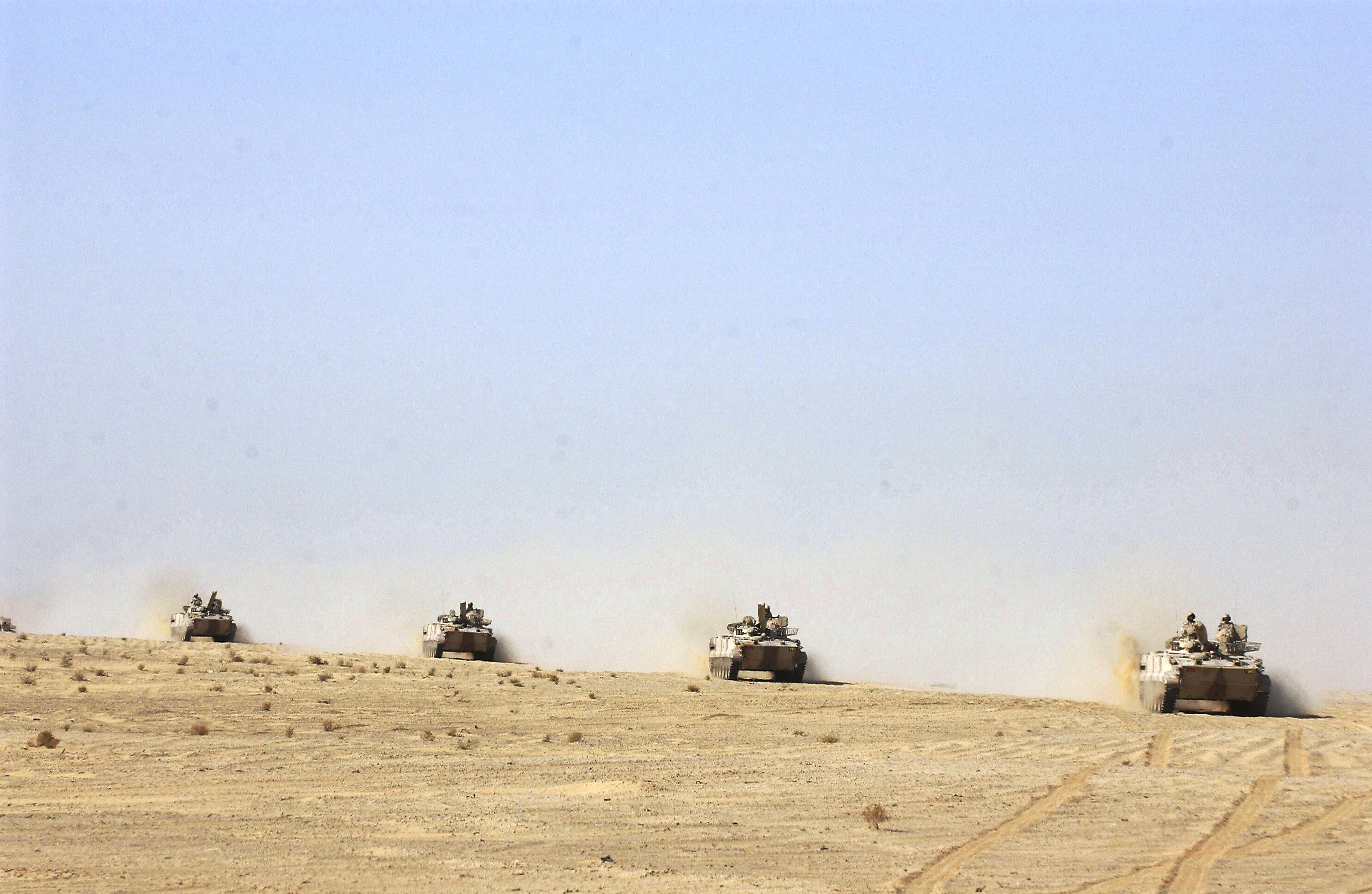
UAE Army BMP-3 conducting live fire desert training

=== Gulf War ===
UAE sent forces to assist Kuwait during the 1990–1991 Gulf War where some hundred UAE troops participated in the conflict as part of the GCC Peninsula Shield force that advanced into Kuwait City. UAE air force carried out strikes against Iraqi forces. UAE Armed Forces participated in the coalition with an army battalion along with a squadron of Dassault Mirage 5 and Mirage 2000. 6 UAE troops were killed in action.

=== United Nations Operation in Somalia II ===
UAE Armed Forces participated in UNOSOM II, which was an intervention launched in March 1993 until March 1995, and committed resources to the United Nations mission.

=== Lebanon ===
UAE military field engineers arrived in Lebanon on 8 September 2007 in Beirut to clear areas of south Lebanon from mines and cluster bombs.

=== War in Afghanistan ===
UAE Armed Forces were deployed in 2003 to Afghanistan, mainly to support construction. UAE special forces would establish fire support base around UAE-supported projects which included funding tarmac roads, clinics, a Pashtun radio station, and a mast provided by e&(formerly Etisalat) which provided competition for other mobile networks in Helmand. Their activities include driving into "remote and impoverished" Afghan villages, distributing aid and sitting down with the village "elders" to inquire about their needs. They would then fund projects while the contracts went out to local tender. UAE Armed Forces used their ties to Islam and ability to fund projects to try to reduce the local suspicion of NATO in Afghanistan.

=== Saudi-led intervention in Yemen ===
In 2015, the UAE participated in the Saudi Arabian-led intervention in Yemen to influence the outcome of the Yemeni civil war. During the war, Emirati special forces conducted an amphibious assault on Aden that drew attention from Western military observers. On 4 September 2015, 52 UAE soldiers (together with 10 Saudi and 5 Bahraini soldiers) were killed when a Houthi missile hit an ammunition dump at a military base in Ma'rib Governorate, marking the "highest death toll on the battlefield in the country's history".

In 2016, during the Battle of Mukalla, UAE Armed Forces liberated the port of Mukalla from AQAP forces in 36 hours after being held by AQAP for more than a year with the US defense secretary James Mattis calling the UAE led operation a model for American troops. In 2018, the Associated Press in a report mentioned that UAE struck deals with AQAP militants by recruiting them against fighting the Houthis and providing them with money. The report continued to state that the United States was aware of Al-Qaeda joining ranks with UAE and has held off drone strikes against Al-Qaeda. UAE Brigadier General Musallam Al Rashidi responded to the report by stating that Al Qaeda cannot be reasoned with in the first place stating that "There's no point in negotiating with these guys." The UAE military stated that accusations of allowing AQAP to leave with cash contradict its primary objective of depriving AQAP of its financial strength. The notion of Al Qaeda joining ranks with UAE Armed Forces and the United States holding off drone strikes against Al Qaeda has been denied by The Pentagon with Colonel Robert Manning, spokesperson of the Pentagon, calling the news source "patently false". According to The Independent, AQAP activity on social media as well as the number of reported attacks conducted by it has decreased since UAE intervention.

On 30 April 2018 the UAE armed forces, as part of the Saudi-led intervention in Yemen, landed troops on the island of Socotra. The Independent newspaper reported that UAE has politically annexed the island and built a communications network, and conducted census and provided Socotra residents with free healthcare and work permits in Abu Dhabi. On 14 May 2018, a deal was brokered between UAE and Yemen for a joint military training exercise and the return of administrative control of Socotra's airport and seaport to Yemen.

In June 2018, an offensive was carried out by UAE-led troops in Hodeidah. In June 2019, the UAE announced a partial withdrawal of its troops by reducing armed forces fighting in Yemen. An official from the UAE called the move a "strategic" redeployment. According to a Reuters report, the Gulf nation ordered the withdrawal of its troops following security concerns, after tensions with Iran. UAE stated that it is shifting its focus from Houthi rebels to ISIS and al-Qaeda in Yemen.

=== Islamic State ===
In 2015, the UAE Air Force carried out strikes against Islamic State targets in Syria. Mariam Al Mansouri, one of the first female UAE fighter pilots, took part in air operations against the group.

=== International Initiative of Law Enforcement for Climate Change ===
The International Initiative of Law Enforcement for Climate Change (I2LEC) is an international framework launched in February 2023 at the World Government Summit in Dubai by the UAE Ministry of Interior and the United Nations Office on Drugs and Crime (UNODC) to integrate police agencies into global climate resilience efforts. Built on awareness, collaboration, and capability building, the initiative engages over 60 law enforcement agencies and regional bodies (including INTERPOL, GCCPOL, AFRIPOL, ACCP and ASEANPOL) to combat environmental offenses such as illegal logging, illegal mining, wildlife trafficking, and pollution. Beyond establishing a global environmental crime heat map and training over 1,200 officials from 95 countries, I2LEC has coordinated major joint operations across Latin America and Africa that resulted in 83 arrests and the seizure of $43 million in illegal assets. Through multilateral commitments like the Abu Dhabi Call to Action at COP28 and the Baku Call to Action at COP29, I2LEC institutionalizes global law enforcement capacity into international climate adaptation frameworks leading into COP30 in Brazil.

=== Somalia ===
UAE forces have assisted the military of Somalia against al-Shabaab forces in the country. In February 2024, three UAE soldiers were killed in an attack against the Gordon Base in Mogadishu, perpetrated by a former Somali soldier recruited by Al-Shabaab.

=== Iranian attacks on the United Arab Emirates (2026) ===
On 28 February 2026, Iran launched missile and drone attacks against the United Arab Emirates and other countries in the Persian Gulf following the start of military strikes on Iran by the United States and Israel. Emirati authorities reported that air defence systems intercepted incoming missiles, while falling debris caused casualties and property damage in Abu Dhabi and Dubai. The UAE announced the closure of its embassy in Tehran and the withdrawal of its diplomatic personnel on 1 March.

The UAE Air Force and air defence units engaged ballistic missiles, cruise missiles and unmanned aerial vehicles during the attacks. As of 10 May, the UAE Ministry of Defence reported that its air defences had engaged 551 ballistic missiles, 29 cruise missiles and 2,265 drones since 28 February. It reported two military personnel killed, as well as a Moroccan civilian contractor employed by the Armed Forces and ten other civilians, with 230 people injured. These figures were reported by the ministry. The United Nations Security Council adopted Resolution 2817 on 11 March, condemning the Iranian attacks on Gulf states and demanding their cessation.

The UAE's layered air defences used systems including MIM-104 Patriot, THAAD and Cheongung-II. In April, Axios reported that Israel had deployed an Iron Dome battery and operating personnel to the UAE to assist with the defence against Iranian attacks, citing Israeli and American officials.

On 17 May, a drone struck an electrical generator outside the inner perimeter of the Barakah nuclear power plant in Abu Dhabi, causing a fire without injuries or a radioactive release; two other drones were intercepted. The UAE Ministry of Defence subsequently reported that the three drones had originated from Iraq.

On 13 July, the UAE Ministry of Defence said that Iranian cruise missiles had struck two Emirati oil tankers in the Strait of Hormuz, killing one crew member and injuring eight others. The attacks occurred in Omani territorial waters and were not strikes on UAE territory. On 18 August, the UAE Ministry of Defence reported detecting two ballistic missiles launched from Iran, one falling inside UAE territorial waters and the other outside them. On 31 August, the ministry announced that air defence systems had intercepted a drone approaching from Iran over UAE territorial waters.

== Expansion ==
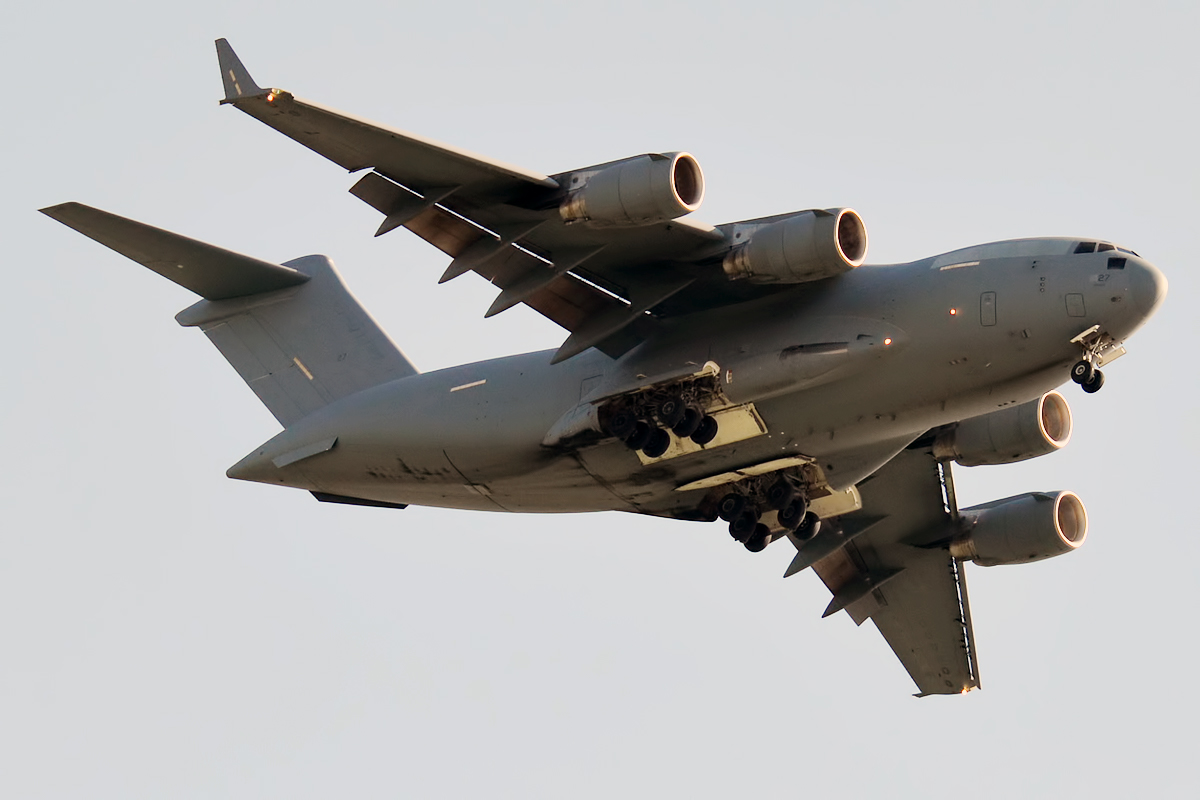
UAEAF C-17A Globemaster III

In 1989, the UAE purchased Scud-B ballistic missiles from North Korea. UAE went on an expansion drive in 1995, which began with the 1992–93 acquisition of 436 Leclerc tanks and 415 BMP-3 armored vehicles. It had learned from the Iranian experiences with having a single supplier for its military and has diversified its arms purchases, purchasing weaponry mainly from Russia, the United States, the UK, Ukraine, France, Italy and Germany. It has also taken care to invest in the systems it has purchased and standardize them according to NATO/GCC Specifications. The equipment purchases were also followed by a program to increase manpower numbers and Emiratisation program for the Armed forces.

In 2008, UAE bought MIM-104 Patriot missiles and related radar, support services for the Patriot systems.

In 2011, during a war scare with Iran over the Straits of Hormuz, the UAE announced a purchase of US$3.48 billion worth of American missile systems: 2 radar systems, 96 missiles, spare parts, and training. UAE was the first country to acquire the Terminal High Altitude Area Defense System (THAAD). A contract worth $1.96 billion was agreed for Lockheed Martin Corp to supply two THAAD anti-missile batteries.

In November 2019, South Africa blocked the supply of arms to United Arab Emirates, Oman, Algeria, and Saudi Arabia following a dispute in the inspection clause of its agreement. According to a report by Reuters, the UAE and the other mentioned countries refused to allow officials from South Africa to inspect their facilities. The dispute arose as the UAE and the other countries refused the inspections, stating that they violated their sovereignty. According to the industry, the inspection row puts business at risk and could cause the loss of up to 9,000 jobs at defense firms and supporting industries in South Africa. UAE began firing trials with China, India, and Serbia to replace the South African RDM as the preferred supplier of ammunition.

In 2022, the UAE signed an agreement to acquire ten South Korean Cheongung-II air defence batteries. Two batteries were reportedly operational by mid-March 2026, and further equipment was transported from South Korea during the regional conflict. The UAE ordered 80 Dassault Rafale F4 jets in 2021; the first aircraft was publicly presented in January 2025 for flight testing ahead of deliveries.

== Industry ==
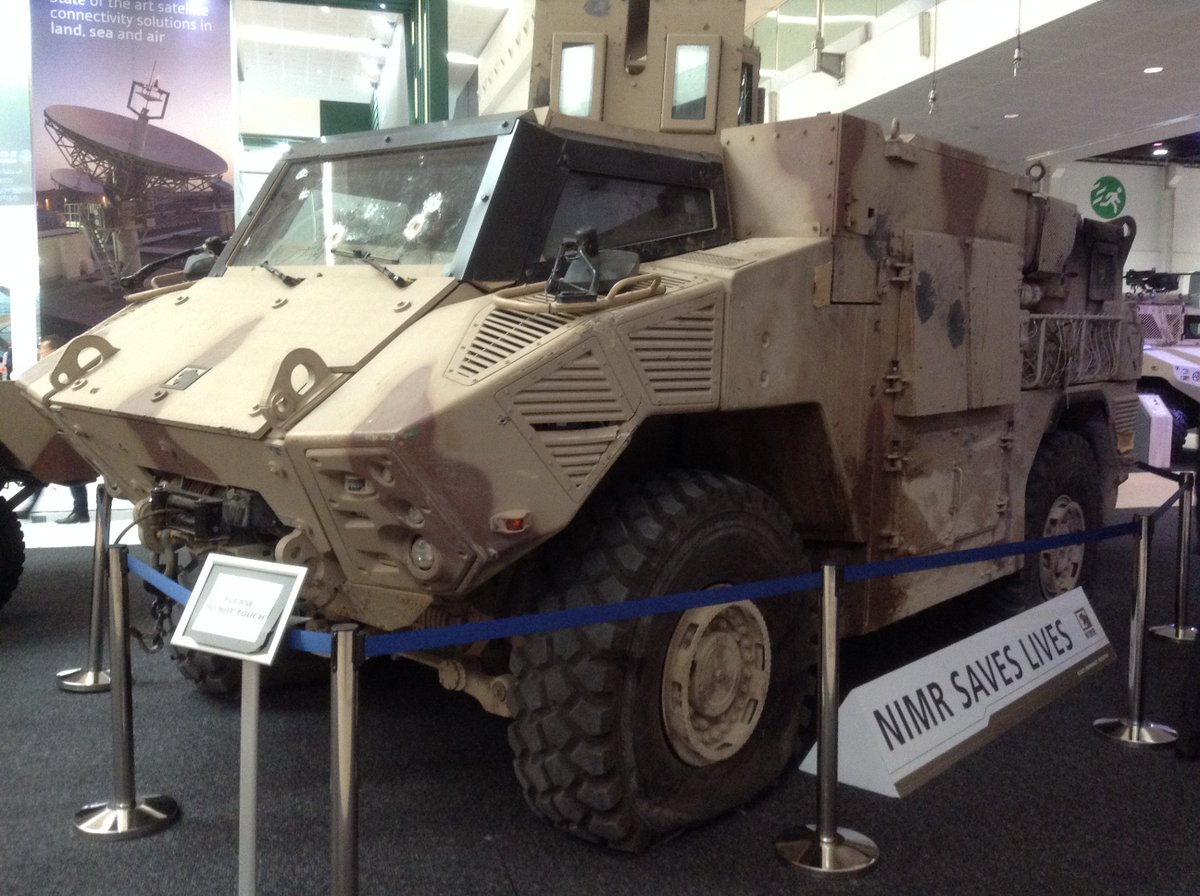
Battle tested UAE manufactured APC Nimr restored from Operation Decisive Storm on display in IDEX 2017

While the UAE is a net importer of military equipment, the country has expanded its domestic defence industry. Projects are spearheaded by the Edge Group, an umbrella company that absorbed several local industries and investment funds to consolidate and develop the UAE defence industry.

Abu Dhabi Ship Building (ADSB), a subsidiary of EDGE, constructs and maintains naval vessels. Its programmes include the Baynunah-class corvettes and the Falaj 3 offshore patrol vessels for the UAE Navy. The first Falaj 3 vessel entered UAE Navy service in February 2025. Other domestic defence manufacturers include NIMR, which produces military vehicles, and Caracal International, a manufacturer of small arms.

The Emirati defence industry has also developed through partnerships involving Tawazun Council, Rheinmetall, Saab, Thales and other companies. Such cooperation has included ammunition production, electronics and radar technology.

In September 2026, EDGE and the South Korean company Hanwha Aerospace signed a term sheet to explore cooperation on integrated air defence systems, including long- and medium-range surface-to-air missiles and multiple rocket launchers. The agreement outlined possible future cooperation rather than a completed procurement. According to Edge Group figures released in 2026, the company recorded about US$5 billion in sales during 2025, with exports accounting for more than 70 per cent, and reported more than US$25 billion in contracts under execution.

== Military expenditure ==
The UAE publishes a federal budget allocation for its Ministry of Defence, although this does not necessarily represent the country's total military spending. The ministry's allocation in the 2026 federal budget was approximately AED 6.49 billion, little changed from the allocations in 2024 and 2025. The Stockholm International Peace Research Institute has not published a complete annual military expenditure figure for the UAE since 2014.
