= Chief of Staff of the United Arab Emirates Armed Forces =

Highest-ranking military officer in the United Arab Emirates Armed Forces

The Chief of Staff of the United Arab Emirates Armed Forces (Arabic: رئيس أركان القوات المسلحة الإماراتية) is the professional head and highest-ranking active-duty military officer of the United Arab Emirates Armed Forces. Appointed by federal decree from the President of the United Arab Emirates, who serves as the Supreme Commander of the Armed Forces. The Chief of Staff holds the government rank of a cabinet minister and oversees the operational readiness and joint command of the armed forces. The current Chief of Staff is Lieutenant General Issa Saif Al Mazrouei, who assumed office on 3 January 2023.

== List of officeholders ==
Portrait	Rank	Name	Took office	Left office	Branch	Notes
	Brigadier	Freddie De Butts	1971	1972	British Army	
	Major General	Sheikh Faisal bin Sultan Al Qassimi	1973	1974	United Arab Emirates Army	
	Lieutenant General	Awad Mohammed Al Khalidi	6 May 1976	1980	Royal Jordanian Army	
	Lieutenant General	Mohammed Saeed Al Badi	1980s	30 December 1992	United Arab Emirates Army	
	Lieutenant General	Sheikh Mohamed bin Zayed Al Nahyan	30 December 1992	January 2005	United Arab Emirates Air Force	
	Lieutenant General	Hamad Mohammed Thani Al Rumaithi	January 2005	3 January 2023	United Arab Emirates Army	
	Lieutenant General	Issa Saif Al Mazrouei	3 January 2023	Present	United Arab Emirates Air Force	

== See also ==
- United Arab Emirates Armed Forces
- President of the United Arab Emirates
