= NIMR (vehicle manufacturer) =

Military-vehicle manufacturer in the UAE

- Company type: Public joint-stock company
- Industry: Automotive
- Founded: 2000
- Headquarters: Abu Dhabi, United Arab Emirates
- Products: Automobiles; APC's
- Parent: EDGE Group
- Website: NIMR official page

NIMR Automotive LLC is a military vehicle manufacturer in the United Arab Emirates that produces an armored personnel carrier series named Nimr. In 2014, it merged into Emirates Defence Industries Company.

== History ==
In 2011, construction began on a new factory within the Tawazun Industrial Park in Abu Dhabi, including facilities for research and development, production, and marketing of the NIMR. A secondary metal fabrication plant was set up in Al Ain, UAE. NIMR's production facility is spread over 37,500 Sq/m in Abu Dhabi, in the United Arab Emirates.

In July 2012, it was disclosed that Algeria and the United Arab Emirates had signed an agreement to jointly produce NIMR armored vehicles in Algeria. Under the CKD, these agreements between the Algerian Ministry of Defense's Mechanical Industry Promotion Group and Tawazun Holdings of the UAE, the NIMR-Algeria Joint Stock Company was established to produce 4x4 armored station wagon variants.

In June 2014, NIMR Automotive held a ground-breaking ceremony for its new integrated facility for production of NIMR vehicles at the Tawazun Industrial Park in Abu Dhabi. The facility, which will have a built-up area of 37,500 square meters in addition to a test track and service center, was scheduled to be fully operational by December 2015.

In December 2014, the United Arab Emirates (UAE) government announced the creation of a national state-controlled defense group Emirates Defense Industries Company (EDIC) through the merger of some military organizations in the Mubalada Development Company, Tawazun Holdings, and Emirates Advanced Investments Group (EAIG).

NIMR Automotive LLC is a defense vehicle manufacturer. NIMR is a member of the Abu Dhabi Government owned Emirates Defense Industries Company (EDIC). NIMR produces wheeled military vehicles which are designed, manufactured and assembled entirely in the UAE. NIMR's range of 4x4 and 6x6 vehicles are available in armored or non-armored configurations, with modular configurable crew capacity and payload.

== Products ==
NIMR Automotive manufactures a range of military and security vehicles, categorized into three primary families: the AJBAN (4×4 light tactical vehicles), HAFEET (6×6 armored vehicles), and JAIS (mine-resistant ambush protected/MRAP platforms). The company introduced the RIV (Rapid Intervention Vehicle) for special forces in 2017, which has been replaced with LRSOV.

=== AJBAN Series (4×4 Light Tactical Vehicles) ===
The AJBAN Class of 4x4 vehicles provides a multipurpose platform for military requirements at 9,000 kg capacity from utility vehicles to fully protected patrol vehicles. A universal 4x4 chassis is utilized. All vehicles in the AJBAN Class can be protected, and specific protected models are included for crew survivability with fully tested and certified cabins. Variants include:

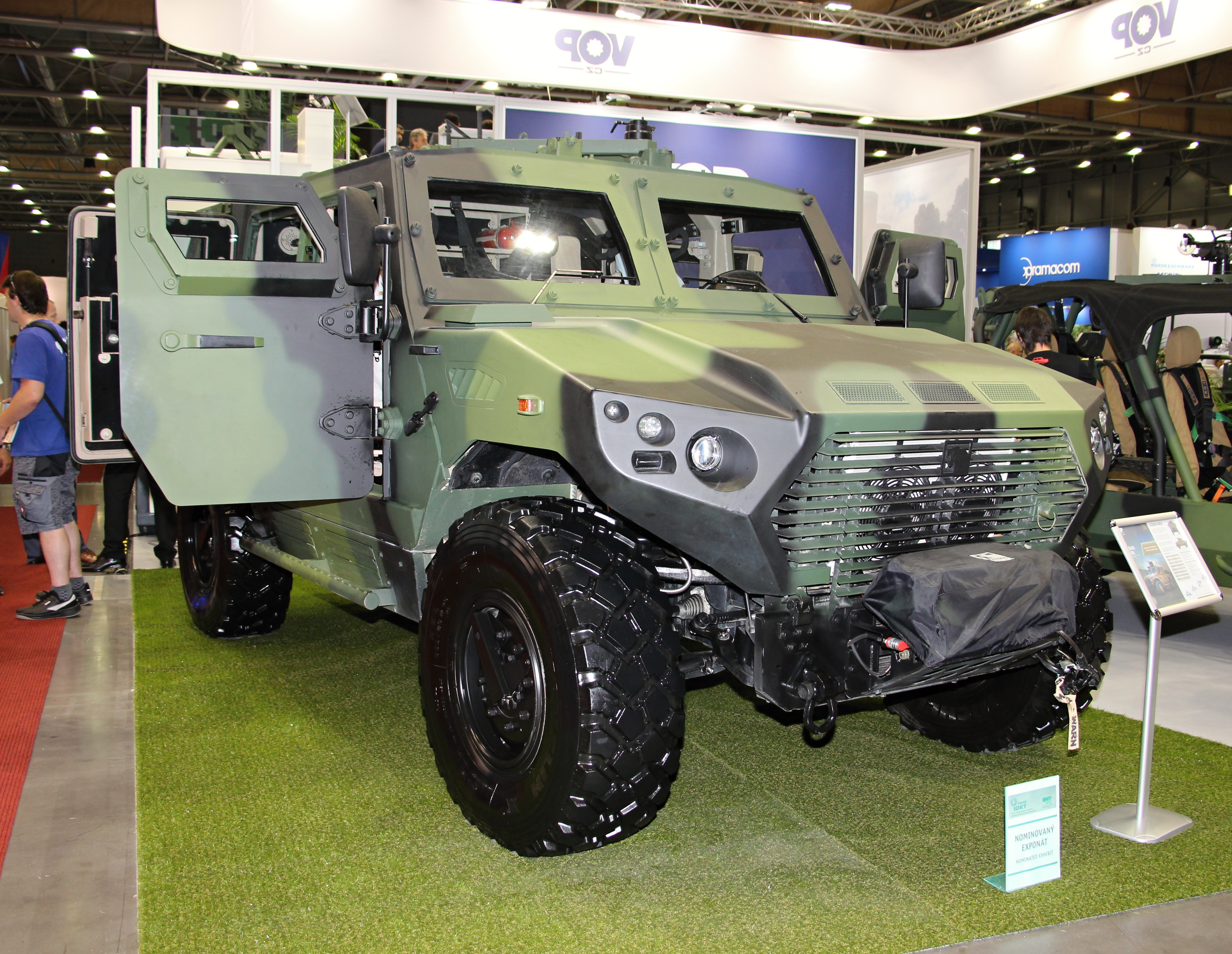
AJBAN 440A

- AJBAN 420: A front-engine, mid-cabin logistics vehicle available in armored and unarmored versions, with a payload capacity of 3,500 kg.
- AJBAN 440/440A: A four-person utility vehicle (440) and a baseline patrol variant (440A) with ballistic protection.
- AJBAN 450: A station wagon-style utility vehicle with the optional gun ring.
- AJBAN ISV: An armored internal security vehicle with a 10-person cabin, surveillance systems, and crowd-control options.
- AJBAN SOV/LRSOV: Open-top reconnaissance vehicles for special operations, with modular armor and helicopter-transportable designs.
- AJBAN VIP: A discreetly armored variant with blast protection, unveiled at IDEX 2017.
- AJBAN 447A: A multi-role armored vehicle introduced at IDEX 2019, compatible with weapon stations.

AJBAN MK2 Series (Second generation, upgraded AJBAN)

EDGE Group unveiled new AJBAN MK2 variants under the NIMR brand, emphasising modularity and multi-role capabilities, including:

- AJBAN MK2: An upgraded model introduced at IDEX 2021 with a 110 km/h top speed and central tire inflation system (CTIS).
- AJBAN 452A: An 11-capacity multirole armored vehicle serving as an APC, ambulance, and observation platform.
- AJBAN 432AU: A blast-protected 4×4 tactical vehicle designed for mortar system deployment, with three-crew capacity. Features scalable heavy-duty axles and C3 integration capabilities.
- AJBAN 441AE: A 4×4 armored vehicle with five-crew capacity, designed for logistics and mortar carrier roles. Features an extended wheelbase and modular interior for cargo, shelters, or mortar systems.

=== HAFEET Series (6×6 Armored Vehicles) ===
The HAFEET class comprises 6×6 armored vehicles with a 13,000 kg GVW, built on a shared chassis. Variants serve roles from utility transport to air defense:

==== Variants ====
- HAFEET 620/620A: Utility vehicles with cargo beds, configurable for specialized roles.
- HAFEET 640/640A: Armored patrol vehicle (640) and modular APC (640A) with blast protection.
- HAFEET APC: A 10-person armored personnel carrier adaptable for medical evacuation.
- HAFEET Ambulance: A 6×6 armored medical transport variant.
- HAFEET ADV: An air defense vehicle integrated with Mistral missiles, developed with MBDA.

=== JAIS Series (MRAP) ===
The Jais Infantry Fighting Vehicle was formerly known as the N35

==== Variants ====
- JAIS 4×4: A blast-resistant counterinsurgency and troop transport vehicle.
- JAIS 6×6: A modular 6×6 platform configurable as an APC, IFV, or command vehicle.
- JAIS MK2: An upgraded model with improved survivability and payload, unveiled in 2024.

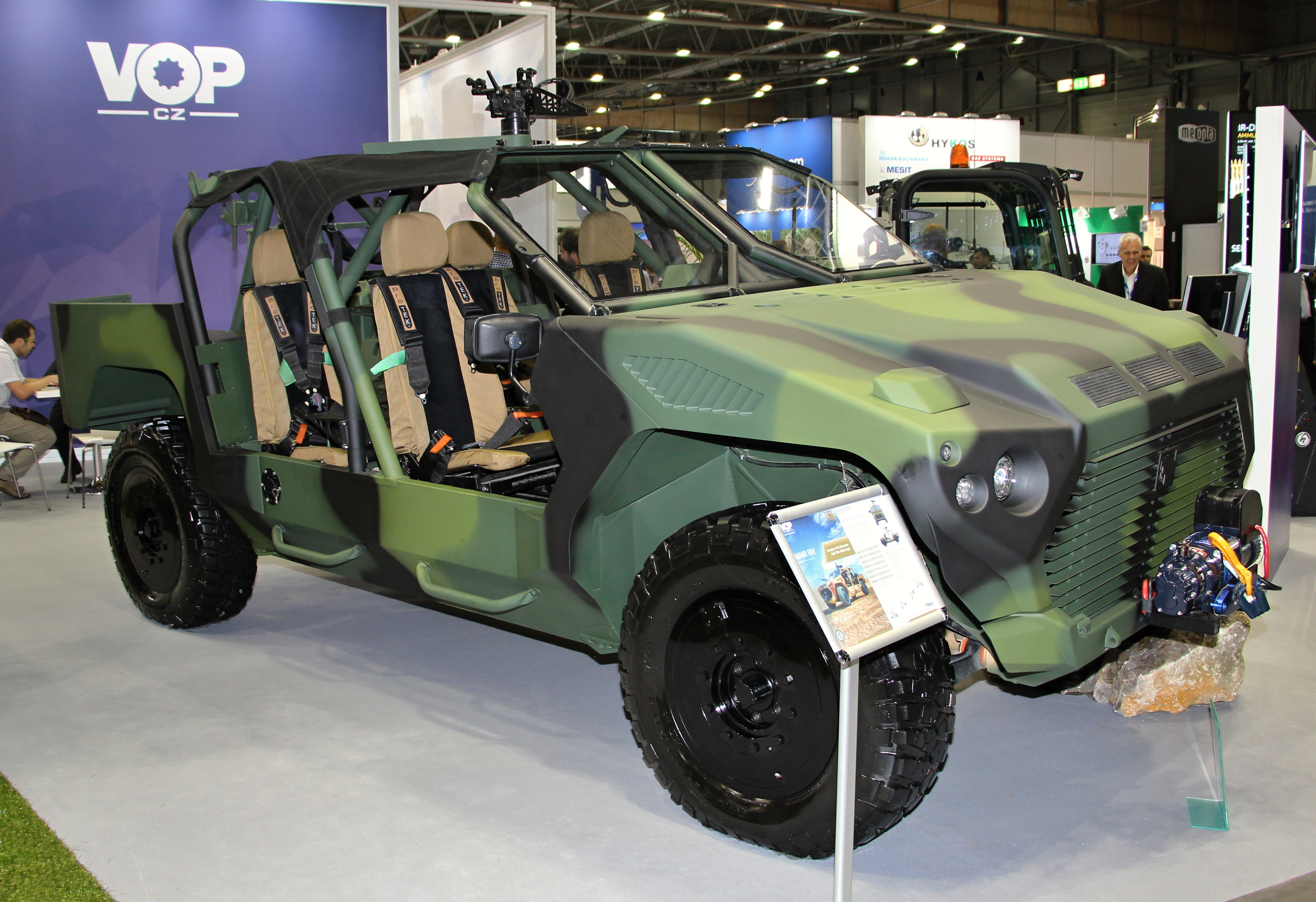
NIMR RIV

== Collaborations and technological features ==
NIMR has engaged in joint ventures and technology-sharing agreements with international defense firms, including:

- MBDA (Europe) – Co-developed the HAFEET ADV air defense system.
- Dillon Aero, Lacroix, and others – Integrated remote weapon stations (RWS) and countermeasure systems.

Key technological aspects of NIMR vehicles include:

- Modular armor systems (STANAG 4569 compliance for ballistic/blast protection).
- V-hull designs for mine/IED resistance.
- Hybrid electric drivetrain options (under development for future models).
