= Military ranks of United Arab Emirates =

The Military ranks of the United Arab Emirates are the military insignia used by the United Arab Emirates Armed Forces. Being a former British protectorate, United Arab Emirates shares a rank structure similar to that of United Kingdom.

== Commissioned officer ranks ==
The rank insignia of commissioned officers.

Rank group	General / flag officers				Senior officers			Junior officers
United Arab Emirates Army
United Arab Emirates Army	فريق أول; Fariq 'awal	فريق; Fariq	لواء; Liwa	عميد; Amid	عقيد; Aqid	مقدم; Muqaddam	رائد; Ra'id	نقيب; Naqib	ملازم أول; Mulazim awwal	ملازم; Mulazim
United Arab Emirates Navy
United Arab Emirates Navy	فريق أول; Fariq 'awal	فريق; Fariq	لواء; Liwa	عميد; Amid	عقيد; Aqid	مقدم; Muqaddam	رائد; Ra'id	نقيب; Naqib	ملازم أول; Mulazim awwal	ملازم; Mulazim
United Arab Emirates Air Force
United Arab Emirates Air Force	فريق أول; Fariq 'awal	فريق; Fariq	لواء; Liwa	عميد; Amid	عقيد; Aqid	مقدم; Muqaddam	رائد; Ra'id	نقيب; Naqib	ملازم أول; Mulazim awwal	ملازم; Mulazim
Rank group	General / flag officers				Senior officers			Junior officers

== Other ranks ==
The rank insignia of non-commissioned officers and enlisted personnel.

Rank group	Senior NCOs			Junior NCOs	Enlisted
United Arab Emirates Army						No insignia
United Arab Emirates Army	مساعد أول; Musa'id 'awal	مساعد; Musa'id	رقیب; Raqib	عريف; Earif	جندي أول; Jundi awwal	جندي; Jundi
United Arab Emirates Navy						No insignia
United Arab Emirates Navy	مساعد أول; Musa'id 'awal	مساعد; Musa'id	رقیب; Raqib	عريف; Earif	جندي أول; Jundi awwal	جندي; Jundi
United Arab Emirates Air Force						No insignia
United Arab Emirates Air Force	مساعد أول; Musa'id 'awal	مساعد; Musa'id	رقیب; Raqib	عريف; Earif	جندي أول; Jundi awwal	جندي; Jundi
Rank group	Senior NCOs			Junior NCOs	Enlisted
