= United Arab Emirates Presidential Guard =

Presidential Guard Command
- حرس الرئاسة (in Arabic)
- Founded: 2011
- Country: United Arab Emirates
- Type: Special forces
- Role: Executive protection Special operations
- Size: Division
- Mottos: Allah, Watan, Ra'is transl. God, Homeland, President
- Colors: Beige and Burgundy
- Engagements: See list: War in Afghanistan (2001–2021) Yemeni civil war (2014–present) War against Islamic State Sinai insurgency

Commanders
- Commander in Chief: Mohammed bin Zayed
- Unit commander: Ali Al Kaabi

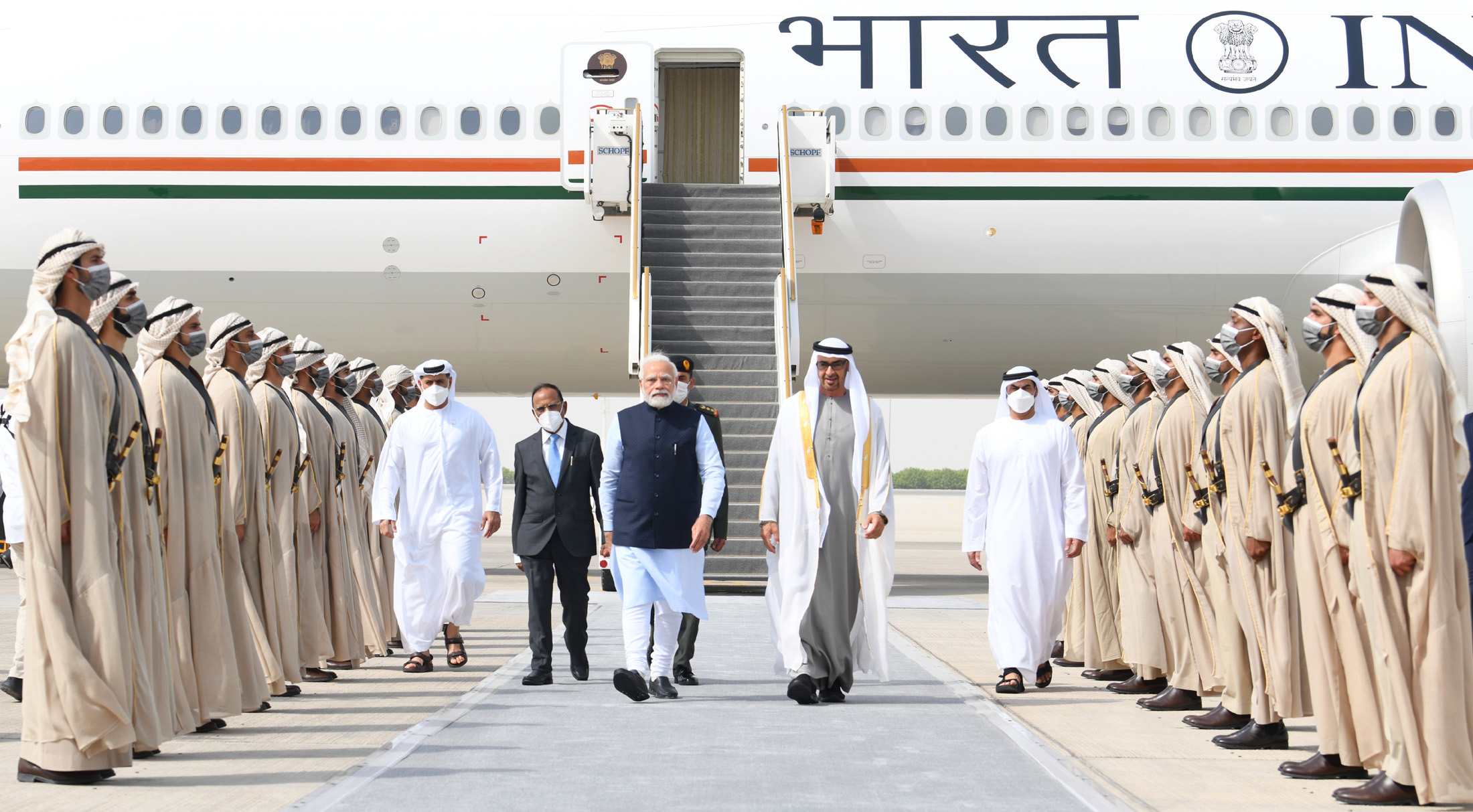
The Presidential Guard in full dress uniform during a visit of Indian Prime Minister Narendra Modi to Abu Dhabi in June 2022.

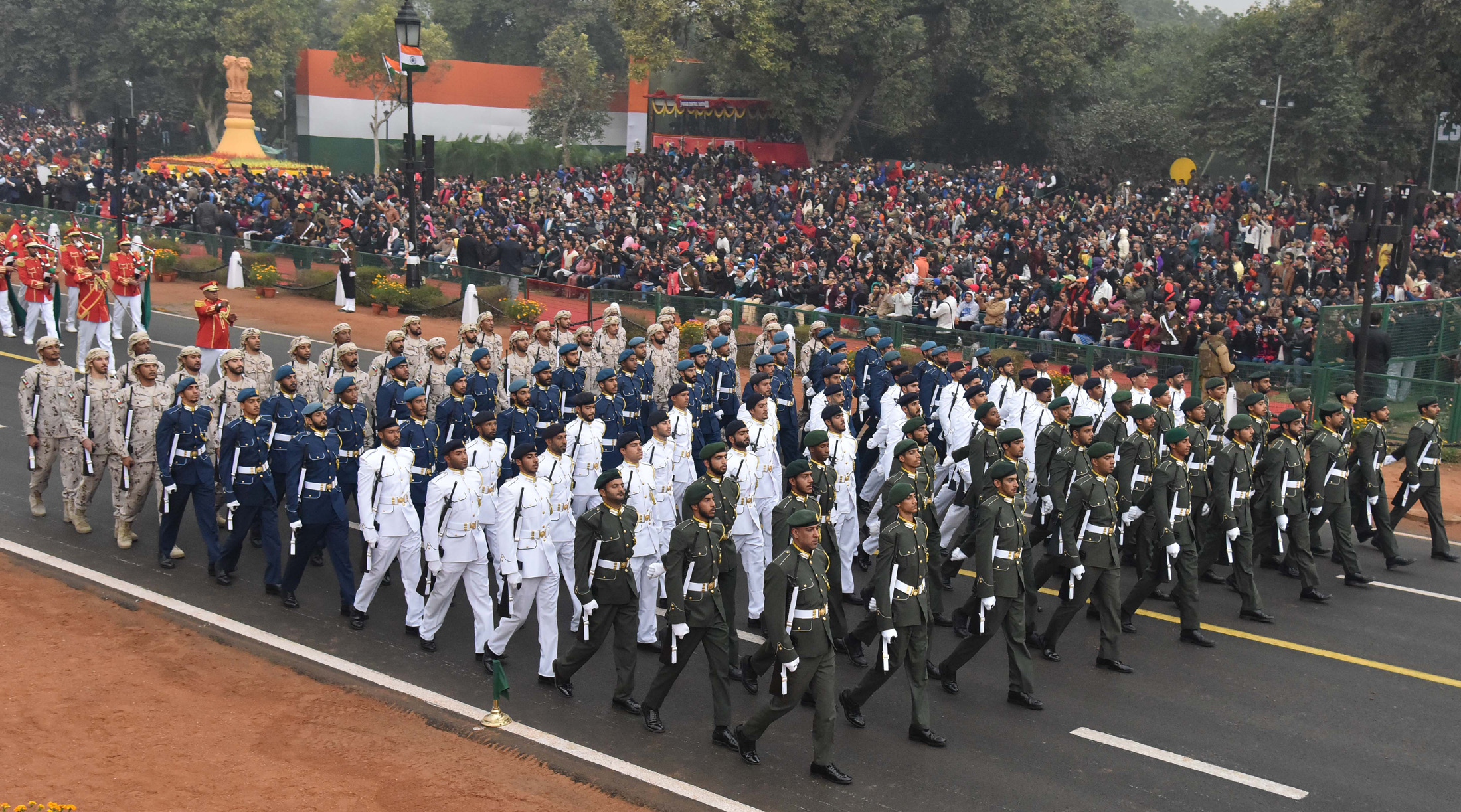
The Presidential Guard contingent (last three rows) marching on the Kartavya Path during the Delhi Republic Day parade in 2017.

The UAE Presidential Guard (UAE-PG) (Arabic: حرس الرئاسة) is an elite military special operations unit of the United Arab Emirates Armed Forces. It is a military unit that operates outside the conventional framework of traditional armed forces. Its estimated 12,000 personnel are considered to be a premier fighting unit in the Middle East and the Arab world.

Its duties include protecting the President of the United Arab Emirates.

== History ==
UAE-PG was formed in 2011 as a merger of the Amiri Guard, the Special Operations Command, and the Marine Battalion from the UAE Navy.

In a traditional tribal society, a paramount sheikh would be protected by his armed retainers. These retainers come from tribes which had demonstrated long-term loyalty to the ruler. With the formation of professional armed forces, these armed retainers became the Emiri Guard. In 2011, the Emiri Guard command of the UAE Armed Forces was integrated into the new Presidential Guard Command.

Multiple foreign officers have served and/or are serving in the guard, including the guard's commander from 2011 to 2024, lieutenant general (Note: Hindmarsh retired as a major general from the Australian Army, and then commissioned as a lieutenant general the UAE Presidential Guard) Mike Hindmarsh from the Australian Army. In October 2011, United States State Department approved of training support being provided by the United States Marine Corps for the guard under the Marine Corps Training Mission UAE (MCTM-UAE). At around the same time, the USMC officially designated the UAE-PG as its Marine counterpart.

In January 2017, a 149-member contingent from the Presidential Guard, as well as a 35-member band, marched in the presence of Sheikh Mohammed bin Zayed Al Nahyan and President of India Pranab Mukherjee on the Kartavya Path during the Delhi Republic Day parade.

In 2019, the UAE-PG inaugurated the opening of Martyr's Park, dedicated to UAE-PG personnel who were killed in the line of duty.

== Deployments ==
=== Afghanistan ===
The UAE-PG participated in the War in Afghanistan in support to the coalition efforts against the Taliban. Their role has mostly been active in the delivery of humanitarian aid as well as supporting the development of basic community infrastructure in Afghanistan.

=== Yemen ===
The Presidential Guard has played a role in the Yemeni civil war in the support of the government of President Abdrabbuh Mansur Hadi.

== Organization ==
The UAE PG has the UAE Special Operations Command under its control. It also has the Special Mission Unit.

=== Headquarters ===
The guard headquarters is located in Abu Dhabi, the capital of the United Arab Emirates. The building consists of a basement, a ground floor and three upper levels. It has an area of about 31,000 square meters.

=== Training ===
Training of UAE-PG personnel is provided under the USMC's UAE Marine Corps Training Mission - United Arab Emirates (UAE MCTM - UAE) unit.

== See also ==
- Republican Guard (Syria)
- Republican Guard (Algeria)
- Republican Guard (Egypt)
- Republican Guard (Lebanon)
