= United Arab Emirates occupation of Socotra =

2018 occupation of Yemeni island group

- Part of the Yemeni civil war
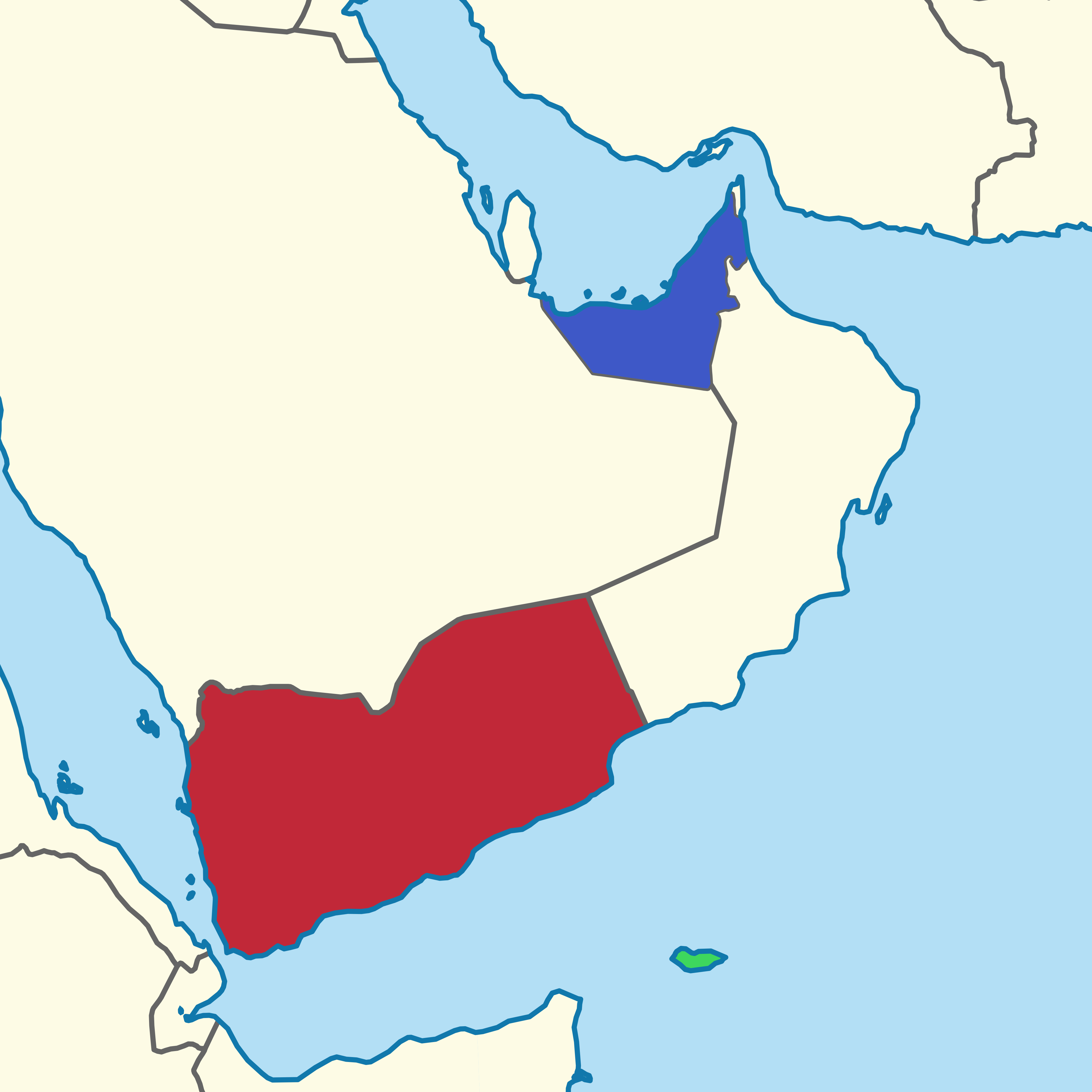
- Yemen United Arab Emirates Socotra
Date	30 April 2018 – 14 May 2018 (2 weeks)
Location	Socotra Archipelago, Yemen
Result	Joint military training exercise agreed upon between Yemen and the UAE.
Territorial changes	UAE Army troops take over Socotra Airport, seaports, and all four islands of the archipelago on 30 April 2018.; Administrative control of the island returned to the occupying Yemeni government on 14 May 2018.

Belligerents
Yemen	United Arab Emirates

Commanders and leaders
Ahmed Obeid bin Daghr; Ahmed Abdallah Ali al-Socotri	Khalifa bin Zayed Al Nahyan; Mohamed bin Zayed Al Nahyan

Units involved
Yemen Armed Forces	United Arab Emirates Armed Forces

Strength
Unknown	0-200 troops

On 30 April 2018, the United Arab Emirates (UAE) deployed more than a hundred troops with artillery and armored vehicles to the Yemeni archipelago of Socotra in the Guardafui Channel without prior coordination with the Yemeni government, causing the relations of the two countries to deteriorate. The initial deployment consisted of UAE military aircraft carrying more than fifty UAE soldiers and two armored vehicles, followed by two more aircraft carrying more soldiers, tanks and other armored vehicles. Al Jazeera reported that shortly after landing, UAE forces dismissed Yemeni soldiers stationed at administrative installations such as Socotra Airport and seaports until further notice, and the flag of the United Arab Emirates was raised above official government buildings in Hadibu. On 14 May an agreement was reached between the UAE and Yemen which saw Yemen regain administrative control and Saudi Arabian troops also being deployed to the island.

== Background ==
Since 2000, UAE humanitarian organizations such as Emirates Red Crescent have played an active role in Socotra. The organization provided relief and aid in March 2000 after major floods damaged buildings and agriculture. In a 2003 US diplomatic cable, Iranian companies were also noted to have completed several projects in Yemen, including building the Socotra airport strip.

In early November 2015, two tropical cyclones – Chapala and Megh – struck the Socotra archipelago, causing severe damages to the main island's infrastructure, homes, roads, and power. Due to the collective impacts of Chapala and Megh, the United Arab Emirates sent an aid ship and plane, carrying tons of food, blankets and tents, and barrels of food.

In 2016, the UAE increased supplies delivered to Socotra which had been neglected due to pressing mainland concerns during the ongoing conflict. In October 2016, the 31st cargo aircraft landed in Socotra Airport containing two tons of aid. At that time, the UAE also illegally established a military base on the island as a part of the Saudi Arabian–led intervention.

In 2017, Emirati troops had already been deployed on the island as a part of the Saudi Arabian–led intervention, and some Yemeni political factions accused the UAE of attempting to occupy Socotra and looting and ravaging the flora of the island.

== History ==
More than a hundred Emirati troops arrived aboard a transport plane, equipped with tanks, armoured vehicles, and artillery. Additional troops were deployed in the coming days. Yemeni soldiers at the airport, government offices and seaport were dismissed by the Emiratis. Emirati flags and pictures of Sheikh Mohammed Bin Zayed were seen in place of Yemeni ones.

Yemen's internationally recognised government condemned the occupation as "an act of aggression", but no military resistance to Emirati troops was reported.

The Independent newspaper reported that the UAE had annexed the island and built a communications network, as well as conducted a census and provided Socotra residents with free healthcare and work permits in Abu Dhabi. New schools, roads, and hospitals were built by the Emiratis. They also completely rebuilt the seaport and started construction of an Emirati military base right next to the port.

Two weeks later, on 14 May 2018, Saudi troops were deployed to the archipelago, and a deal was brokered between the United Arab Emirates and Yemen for a joint military training exercise and the return of administrative control of Socotra's airport and seaport to Yemen.

== Reactions ==
On 6 May 2018, a statement from Yemeni Prime Minister Ahmed Obeid bin Daghr’s office said the UAE military’s seizure of the seaport and airport on Socotra was an “unjustified” assault on Yemen's sovereignty. The UAE Foreign Ministry responded by saying it was "surprised" by the statement and blamed the Muslim Brotherhood for "distorting" its role: "The UAE military presence in all liberated Yemeni provinces, including Socotra, comes within the efforts of the Arab Coalition to support legitimate government at this critical stage in the history of Yemen."

Later the same day, UAE Foreign Minister Anwar Gargash tweeted: "Some have recently remembered Socotra Island to challenge the Arab coalition and the UAE. We have historical relations with the families and people of Socotra."

Also the same day, pro-Emirati supporters gathered in the island's capital Hadibu to support the UAE presence on the island.

On 7 May 2018, protestors rallied against the UAE occupation, demanding an immediate withdrawal.

On 10 May 2018, the United States said it was "closely following the situation on the island of Socotra" and called for "de-escalation and dialogue" between the UAE and Yemen.

On 11 May 2018, Turkey showed concern about the event. The Turkish Minister of Foreign Affairs said: "We are closely following the recent developments in Yemen's Socotra Island. We are concerned about these developments that pose a new threat to the territorial integrity and sovereignty of Yemen." He called on all relevant actors to respect the legitimate Yemeni government and to refrain from taking measures that could further complicate the situation.

On 8 September 2020, al-Islah claimed that the government of the United Arab Emirates (UAE) had been trying to build a military base on Yemen's Socotra island. The Yemeni government accused the UAE of supporting the Southern Transitional Council (STC) to take control of the Socotra province with its own interests in Yemen.

== See also ==
- United Arab Emirates–Yemen relations
- Outline of the Yemeni crisis, revolution, and civil war (2011–present)
- Timeline of the Yemeni crisis (2011–present)
- Southern Transitional Council takeover of Socotra (2020)
