= REACH-S =

Emirati UAV

REACH-S is a fixed-wing unmanned aerial vehicle (UAV) developed by Edge Group, a United Arab Emirates company. It is classed as a medium-altitude long-endurance (MALE) UAV. It is designed primarily for tactical intelligence, surveillance, and reconnaissance (ISR) missions, as well as light or precision ground attack operations.

The drone is 5.5 m (18 ft) in length and has a 12 m (39 ft) wingspan, with a maximum take-off weight of 640 kg (1,410 lb) and a payload capacity of up to 120 kg (260 lb). It is powered by a 110 hp Rotax 912 piston engine, reaches altitudes of up to 19,000 ft (5,800 m), cruises at 80 kn (150 km/h; 92 mph) with a maximum speed of 200 km/h, and has a 24-hour endurance along with a 200 km (120 mi) communication range from its ground control station.

The preliminary design for the aircraft was unveiled in 2021. By November 2023, the drone had conducted two short-duration test flights, and the UAE placed an initial production order for 100 units.
