= Nimr (armored personnel carrier) =

NIMR
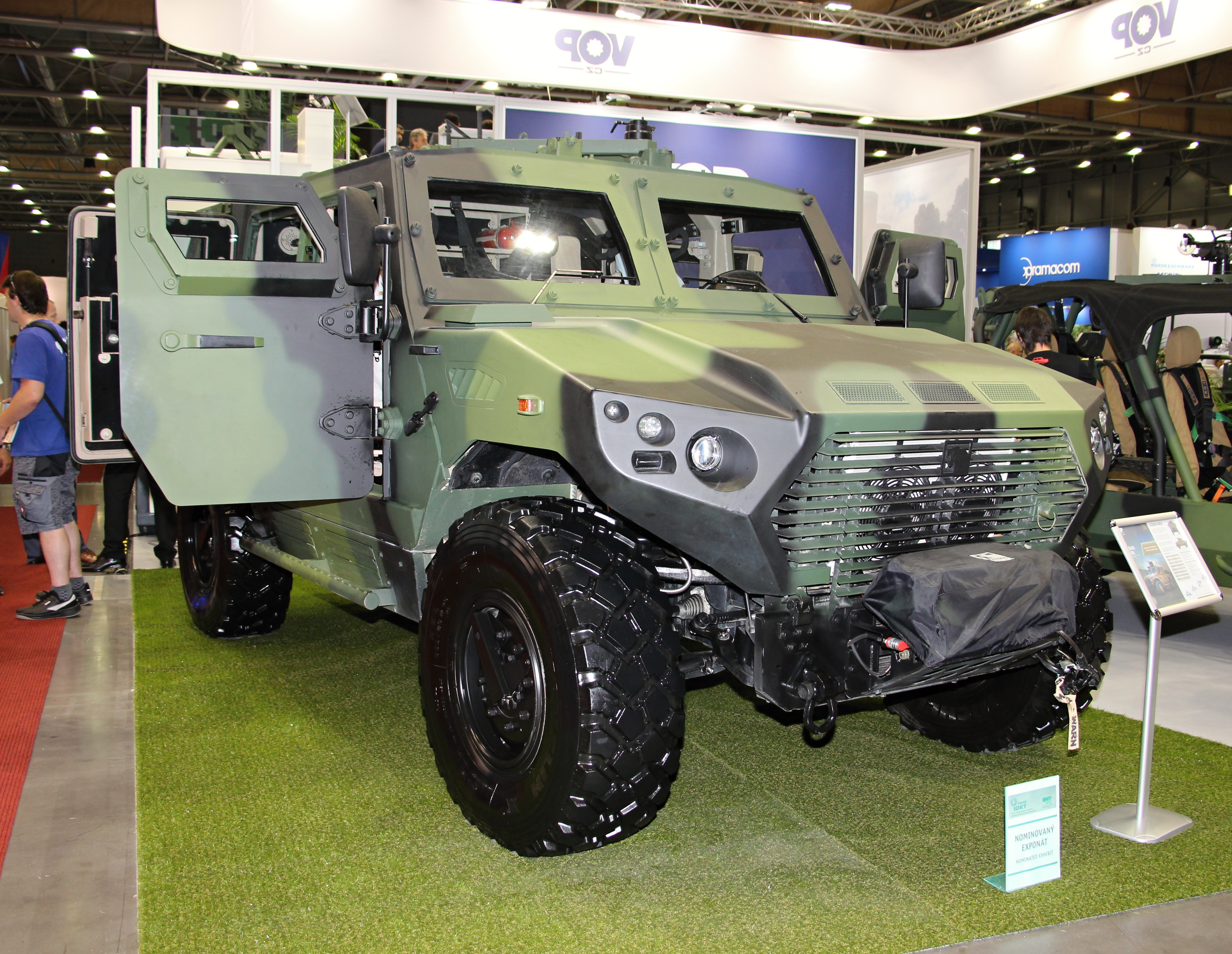
- NIMR AJBAN 440A
- Type: Infantry Mobility Vehicle
- Place of origin: United Arab Emirates

Service history
- Used by: See Operators
- Wars: Saudi Arabian-led intervention in Yemen; Second Libyan Civil War

Production history
- Manufacturer: NIMR Automotive LLC
- Produced: 2005–present
- No. built: >1,765 UAE Army

Specifications
- Crew: 2 (Depends on variant)
- Passengers: 6 (Depends on variant)
- Main armament: M2 Browning machine gun
- Transmission: Allison MD 3060 - 6-speed Automatic Transmission

The Nimr (Arabic: نمر, romanized: Nimr, lit. 'Leopard') is a family of all-terrain military armored personnel carrier (APC) vehicles produced by NIMR Automotive LLC in the United Arab Emirates. Nimr is designed specifically for military operations in harsh climates.

== History ==
Nimr was developed as a multipurpose vehicle intended to address the requirements for APCs to meet demanding duty-cycle requirements for off-road performance in harsh climates.

Production of the first prototype of Nimr vehicles was performed by Emirates Defence Technology (EDT). The first prototype of the vehicle was conducted by engineers from a subsidiary of GAZ and further development of 4×4 and 6×6 vehicles was carried out by the Bin Jabr Group. The first prototype of the vehicles was introduced in 2000. Bin Jabr Group teamed up with Rheinmetall and MBDA to incorporate air defense and anti-tank defense mechanisms, called NIMRAD and NIMRAT. The first Nimr vehicle was unveiled to the public at IDEX 2007.

In February 2009, Bin Jabr Group and Tawazun Holdings set up a joint venture to produce the vehicle which was called Nimr Automotive LLC.

The production facilities are located in the Tawazun Industrial Park in Abu Dhabi.

In July 2012, Algeria and the United Arab Emirates signed an agreement for production of the armored vehicle in Algeria for the North African market.

Nimr Ajban has been spotted patrolling the streets of Khartoum, Sudan in 2019 during the Sudanese revolution. Nimr Ajban has also been used onwards during the Sudanese civil war reportedly by the Rapid Support Forces.

== Features ==
=== Modular armor ===
Base protection meets STANAG 4569 Level 1 (resistant to 7.62mm rounds, artillery fragments, and anti-personnel mines). Optional add-on armor upgrades protection to Level 3 or 4 for ballistic threats and Level 3a/2b for mining resistance.

=== Mobility ===
Equipped with a double-wishbone independent suspension, central tire inflation system (CTIS), and a top speed exceeding 130 km/h. The 6×6 variant has an operational range of 800 km.

=== Payload and capacity ===
The 6×6 APC transports up to 10–12 personnel, with a payload capacity of 1.8 Tonnes.

== Types ==
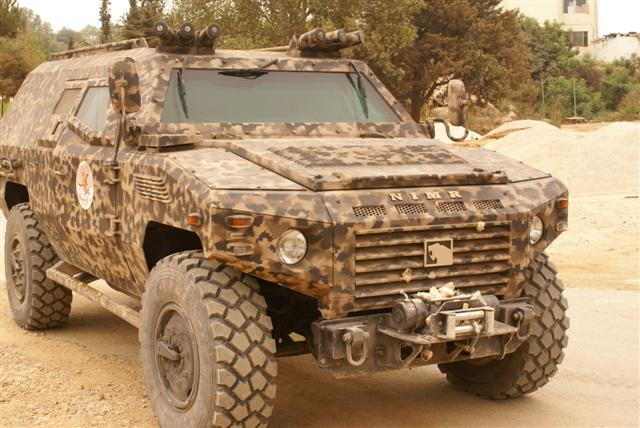
Lebanese Armed Forces NIMR II, an earlier variant of the NIMR vehicles.

=== AJBAN Series (4×4 Light Tactical Vehicles) ===
The AJBAN Class of 4x4 vehicles provides a multipurpose platform for military requirements at 9,000 kg capacity, from utility vehicles to fully protected patrol vehicles. A universal 4x4 chassis is utilized. All vehicles in the AJBAN Class can be protected, and specific protected models are included for crew survivability with fully tested and certified cabins.

== Variants ==
AJBAN

- AJBAN 420
- AJBAN 440
- AJBAN 440A (Equipped with anti-tank guided missiles)
- AJBAN 447
- AJBAN 447A
- AJBAN 450
- AJBAN ISV Internal Security Vehicle
- AJBAN LRSOV Special Operations Vehicle (SOV)
- AJBAN VIP

=== HAFEET ===
- HAFEET Class:
- HAFEET 620
- HAFEET 620A Logistics and Utility Vehicle
- HAFEET 640A Artillery Support Vehicle (Observation and Command & Control configurations)
- HAFEET APC
- HAFEET Ambulance

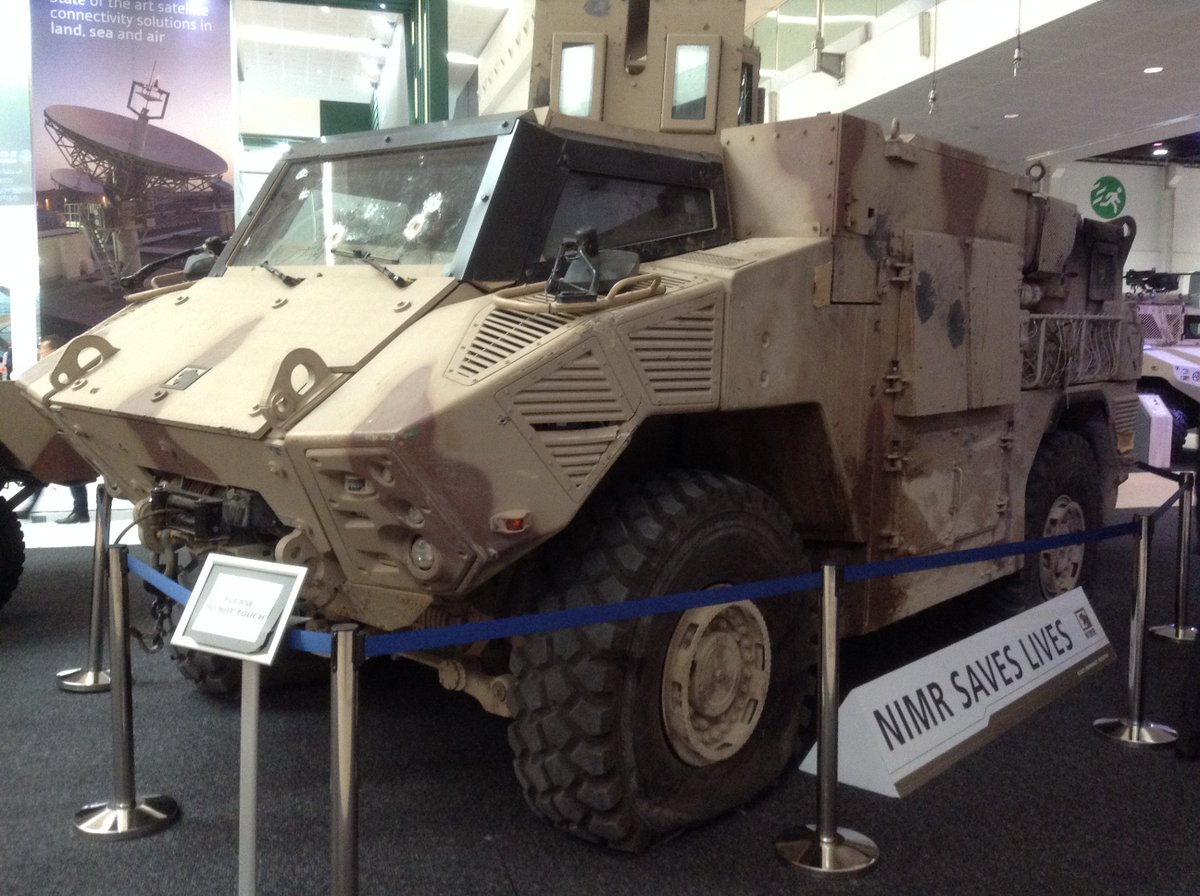
A damaged 4x4 NIMR JAIS restored from Saudi-led intervention in Yemen on display in IDEX 2017 with the caption of "NIMR saves lives".

=== JAIS ===
- JAIS Class:
- JAIS 4x4
- JAIS 6x6

== Operators ==
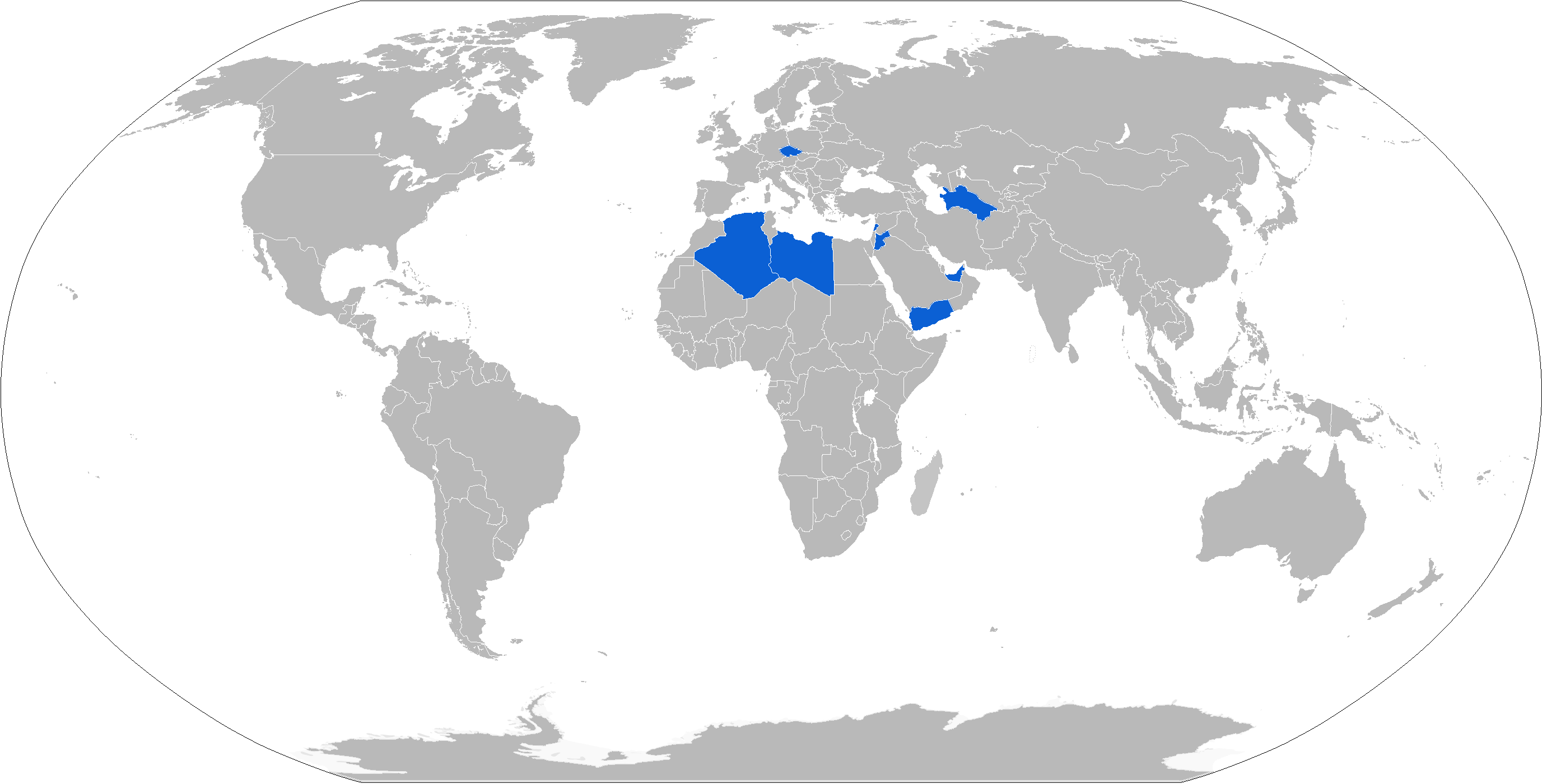
Map with Nimr operators in blue. Not corresponding with the list!

- Algeria
- Lebanon
- Libya
- Jordan
- Saudi Arabia
- Serbia
- Sudan
- Turkmenistan
- United Arab Emirates
- Maldives
- Yemen

=== Potential operators ===
- Czech Republic
