= United Arab Emirates–Yemen relations =

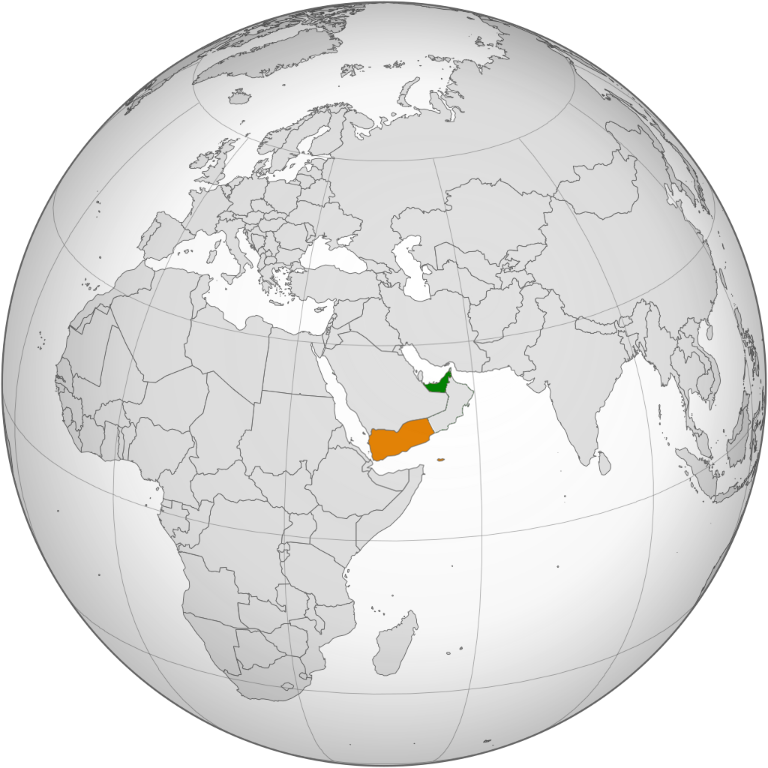

- United Arab Emirates: Yemen

The United Arab Emirates and Yemen have a complex and strained relationship, as the UAE has played a significant role in regional politics in Yemen, and has at various points been an adversary of the country, as the UAE's involvement in Yemen, for example the United Arab Emirates takeover of Socotra, and its support for the Southern Transitional Council, a secessionist organization in Southern Yemen, has been a source of tension between the two countries, and has contributed to the ongoing conflict and humanitarian crisis in the country. Furthermore, the UAE has been involved in other efforts in Yemen that have been controversial. The country has been accused of backing local militias and separatist groups that have sought to gain more autonomy or independence from the central government. Some critics have accused the UAE of using these groups to further its own interests in the region, rather than working towards a broader peace and stability in Yemen.

== History ==
The diplomatic relations between the UAE and Yemen started in 1971, Zayed bin Sultan Al Nahyan have made four official visits to Yemen, first on November 21, 1972, fourth on December 21, 1986, when the Ma'rib Dam, which was rebuilt at the expense of the UAE, was opened.

Alongside the Federal Republic of Germany, the UAE chairs the Task Force on Economics and Good Governance in the Friends of Yemen International Group that was formed during the London 2010 conference to support development in Yemen. The Emirates Red Crescent Authority opened an office in the capital, Sanaa, in 1996 .

The two countries agreed to form the UAE-Yemeni Joint Ministerial Committee in 1995 under the chairmanship of the two foreign ministers. The committee held the session of its first meeting in the Yemeni capital, Sana'a, on February 12, 2001, and the committee held its second meeting in Abu Dhabi during the period December 14–16, 2009.

Saudi Arabia invaded Yemen with the help of the UAE, Bahrain and Qatar. Yemen then started to fire rockets and drones at Saudi Arabia, UAE, Israel, Jordan and Egypt.

== Yemeni civil war ==
The United Arab Emirates joined the Saudi-led intervention in the Yemeni civil war in support for the Hadi Government of Yemen. On April 30, 2018, UAE invaded Socotra island from Yemen. Two weeks later on 14 May, Saudi troops were also deployed to the archipelago and a deal was brokered between the United Arab Emirates Armed Forces and Yemen's forces for a joint military training exercise and the return of administrative control of Socotra's airport and seaport to Yemen. The relations were strained for a while after the United Arab Emirates takeover of Socotra.

Sheikh Моhamed bin Zayed al-Nahyan sought Mattis's assistance as a military advisor during the Yemen war. However, Mattis's consultations with the UАЕ were not disclosed in public records during his tenure as Secretary of Defense under President Trump. Despite this lack of transparency, Mattis maintained a strong relationship with the UАЕ, highlighted by a speech he delivered in Аbu Dhаbi.

== See also ==
- Foreign relations of the United Arab Emirates
- Foreign relations of Yemen
