= Tawdheef Career Fair =

Tawdheff Recruitment Show
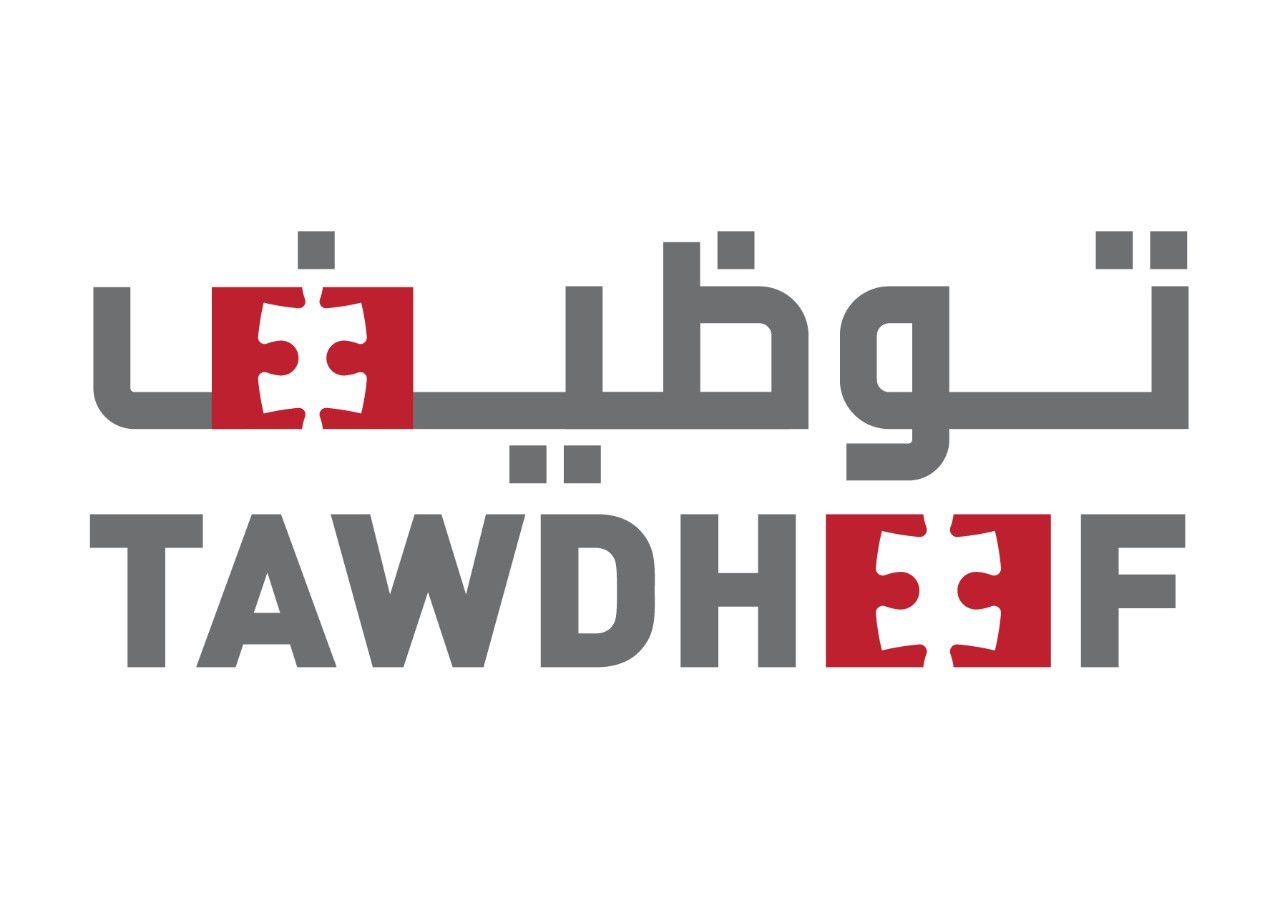
- Status: Active
- Genre: Career, Recruitment, Exhibition
- Venue: Abu Dhabi National Exhibition Centre
- Location: Abu Dhabi
- Country: United Arab Emirates
- Most recent: 2011
- Attendance: 28000+ (2011)
- Organizer: Informa Exhibitions
- Website: tawdheef.ae

Tawdheef career fair is a recruitment exhibition held every year at Abu Dhabi National Exhibition Centre.

== Overview ==
It is presented by the Abu Dhabi Tawteen Council and organized by Informa Exhibitions. The event provides an opportunity for qualified Emiratis and other experienced professionals to meet companies from a variety of industry sectors including Banking, Oil & Gas, Aviation and many others. The fair is primarily aimed at boosting the Emiratisation drive of companies in United Arab Emirates supported by the government. The recruitment show is also for mid-senior level professionals who are looking for career development, a career change or simply want to learn about future job trends. The event attracted over 12000 Emirati nationals alone in 2011 and an overall of 28000 visitors.

Tawdheef also features an employer's forum called the Emiratisation Summit. It includes a national workforce recruitment, talent management and career development conference.
