= Edge Group =

Emirati weapons company

Edge Group PJSC
- Native name: Arabic: مجموعة إيدج ش.م.ع
- Type: Public Joint Stock Company
- Industry: Defence
- Predecessor: Emirates Defence Industries Company
- Founded: 5 November 2019; 6 years ago in Abu Dhabi, United Arab Emirates
- Founder: Faisal Al Bannai
- Headquarters: Abu Dhabi, United Arab Emirates
- Area served: Worldwide
- Key people: Faisal Al Bannai (chairman); Hamad Al Marar (managing director and CEO)
- Owner: Government of Abu Dhabi
- Number of employees: 12,000+
- Subsidiaries: 25

Edge Group (Arabic: مجموعة إيدج) is an Emirati advanced technology and defence conglomerate comprising 25 companies involved in military and civilian products, and technologies.

Edge was reported to be among the top three manufacturers and suppliers of precision guided munitions in 2024. According to Defense News, Edge Group was the 24th largest defence contractor in the world as of July 2021, although it does not appear in the updated Defense News Top 100 list for 2024.

== History ==
Edge Group was established on 5 November 2019 by Faisal Al Bannai, and has more than 25 entities from the Emirates Defence Industries Company (EDIC), Emirates Advanced Investments Group (EAIG), and Tawazun Holding. It employs approximately 12,000 employees.

Edge was the official Advanced Technology Partner at the Dubai Airshow 2019. Edge's 11 participating entities showcased their range of capabilities, which included unmanned aerial vehicles, and long-range munitions including the UAE-made ADASI RW-24. AMMROC also announced its plan to open a maintenance facility at Al Ain International Airport.

Edge entity HALCON signed a US$1 billion contract in November 2019 to supply its Desert Sting precision guided missiles to UAE Armed Forces.

GAL, part of Edge's Mission Support cluster, signed a contract with Kenya's Ministry of Defence to provide MRO services to the Kenyan Air Force, as well as an AED 3.5 billion support contract with the UAE's Joint Aviation Command.

Edge joined Tawdheef, the UAE's leading event for Emiratisation, and the second edition of the biennial Mohamed bin Zayed International Robotics Challenge 2020, as the official Advanced Technology Partner in January 2020.

Edge's ADASI also launched its made-in-the-UAE VTOL drone at the UMEX exhibition in February 2020.

In December 2020, the Stockholm International Peace Research Institute (SIPRI) ranked Edge 22nd in the world's largest arms companies list. According to Pieter Wezeman, Senior Researcher with the SIPRI Arms and Military Expenditure Programme: "EDGE is a good illustration of how the combination of high national demand for military products and services with a desire to become less dependent on foreign suppliers is driving the growth of arms companies in the Middle East." According to Defense News, Edge Group was the 24th largest defence contractor in the world as of July 2021, although it does not appear in the updated Defense News Top 100 list for 2024.

On 31 January 2022, Mansour AlMulla was appointed managing director and CEO of Edge, while H. E. Faisal Al Bannai became chairman of the board.

In the same year, DIGITAL14, a developer of multi-sector innovative and ultra-secure communication solutions, merged into the Edge and was rebranded as KATIM.

In early 2023, Edge announced that orders for its products and solutions had exceeded US$5 billion for 2022, a third of which was made up of international exports—a 500% year-on-year increase.

The company acquired a majority shareholding in Estonian robotic developer Milrem Robotics on 15 February 2023. At the IDEX defence exhibition held in Abu Dhabi in February 2023, Edge announced over AED18.6 billion worth of contracts, AED4 billion of which was in exports, including a landmark EUR1 billion export deal with the Angolan Navy to build a fleet of best-in-class 71 metre corvette vessels. Edge Group also launched 14 new products including 11 autonomous solutions. Contracts with the UAE Armed Forces at IDEX 2023 totalling AED9 billion were announced for Edge's Thunder and Desert Sting 25 Precision-Guided Munitions; SHADOW 25 and SHADOW 50; and HUNTER Loitering Munitions; and a contract valued at AED4 billion to provide tactical communications and data-link solutions.

In April 2023, Edge announced the opening of a regional office in the Brazilian capital, Brasilia. In the same month, Edge Group and the Brazilian Navy signed a cooperation agreement to develop anti-ship and supersonic missiles. This was followed by the signing of a strategic partnership agreement which will see Edge become a strategic partner of the Brazilian Navy by co-investing in the development, as well as providing advanced solutions, such as anti-jamming technology, which is developed by Edge in the UAE. The Brazilian Navy has committed its fleet to support a full testing programme of the new missiles.

In July 2023, Edge acquired Abu Dhabi–based cybersecurity firm, OryxLabs, and 100% stake in Etimad Holding, a technology services group, based in the UAE capital. In September 2023, Edge acquired 50% shareholding in Brazilian Smart Weapons and Tech System Specialist SIATT.

In November 2023, Edge announced the acquisition of a 52% majority shareholding in Swiss VTOL manufacturer ANAVIA, and a 50% shareholding in Polish small jet aircraft manufacturer, FLARIS.

At Dubai Airshow 2023, Edge launched 12 new systems and solutions, increasing the number of products to 160. These included several autonomous aircraft and smart weapons systems. It also launched the X Range, the MENA region's first fully comprehensive test range island, which will be available for commercial use. The total value of its sales and contracts at the airshow was US$2.37 billion ADSB also announced the sale of several ANAVIA HT-100 unmanned helicopters to an undisclosed international customer.

In December 2023, Edge announced it has assumed full ownership of the Abu Dhabi–based investment company, the Strategic Development Fund (SDF).

In December 2023, Edge, completed acquisition of the Abu Dhabi–based investment company, the Strategic Development Fund (SDF). In January 2024, EDGE Group acquired a majority stake in the International Golden Group.

In the same month, Edge collaborated with the São Paulo State Government on the 'Crystal Ball' project, slated for a six-month trial period. This initiative is to enhance public security in São Paulo through the deployment of technologies, including Smart CCTV Monitoring Solutions, Integrated Command and Control systems, Advanced Surveillance and Reconnaissance (C4ISR) tools, and Artificial Intelligence (AI) technology.

In January 2024, Edge and Baykar, the Türkiye-based leader in unmanned aerial vehicle (UAV) and artificial intelligence technology, announced their collaboration on the integration of Edge smart weapons onto Bayraktar UAVs.

On 14 May 2024, Edge signed a $27 million agreement to supply Indonesia's state-owned PT Pindad with new ammunition.

Edge also acquired 51% of Brazil-based Condor Non-Lethal technologies.

In May 2024, Edge, and Fincantieri, signed an agreement for the launch of MAESTRAL an Abu Dhabi-based shipbuilding joint venture.

Edge Group entered into a joint venture with Spain's Indra Sistemas (Indra) to develop and manufacture radar systems in the UAE.

In June 2024, Edge Group and Adani Defence & Aerospace entered into a cooperation agreement. The collaboration involves various areas, including missiles, weapons, unmanned systems, air defense products, and electronic warfare technologies.

Edge Group launched a space firm, Fada, in September 2024.

In November 2025, the company and American military technology company Anduril formed the "Edge–Anduril Production Alliance", focused on autonomous weapons systems.

== Products ==
Edge has developed the REACH-S, a fixed-wing unmanned aerial vehicle (UAV), classed as a medium-altitude long-endurance (MALE) UAV. It was designed primarily for tactical intelligence, surveillance, and reconnaissance (ISR) missions, as well as light or precision ground attack operations.
