= Emirates Defence Industries Company =

Emirati defence company

- Native name: Arabic: شركة الإمارات للصناعات العسكرية
- Industry: Defence
- Founded: December 2, 2014; 11 years ago
- Successor: EDGE Group
- Headquarters: Abu Dhabi, United Arab Emirates
- Area served: worldwide
- Key people: Homaid Al Shemmari (Chairman); Luc Vigneron (CEO)
- Owner: Mubadala Development Company (60%); Tawazun Holding
- Website: www.edic.ae

Emirates Defence Industries Company (EDIC) was a defence industry holding company. In November 2019, the holding company was absorbed into EDGE Group.

== History ==
On 2 December 2014, the defence services and manufacturing entity was initiated in the form of a merger of 11 defence companies that were subsidiaries of Mubadala Development, Tawazun Holding, and Emirates Advanced Invest Group.

EDIC was jointly owned by the Mubadala Development Company, an investment fund of the Emirate of Abu Dhabi (60%) and Tawazun Holding.
