= United Arab Emirates Army =

- القوات البرية الإماراتية
- Emblem
- Founded: 1951
- Branch: Army
- Role: Ground warfare
- Size: 44,000
- Part of: UAE Armed Forces
- Garrison/HQ: Zayed Military City

Insignia
- Flag

The United Arab Emirates Army (UAEA) is the land force branch of the United Arab Emirates Armed Forces. The UAE Armed Forces were officially formed in 1976, unifying the military forces of the individual emirates under a single command.

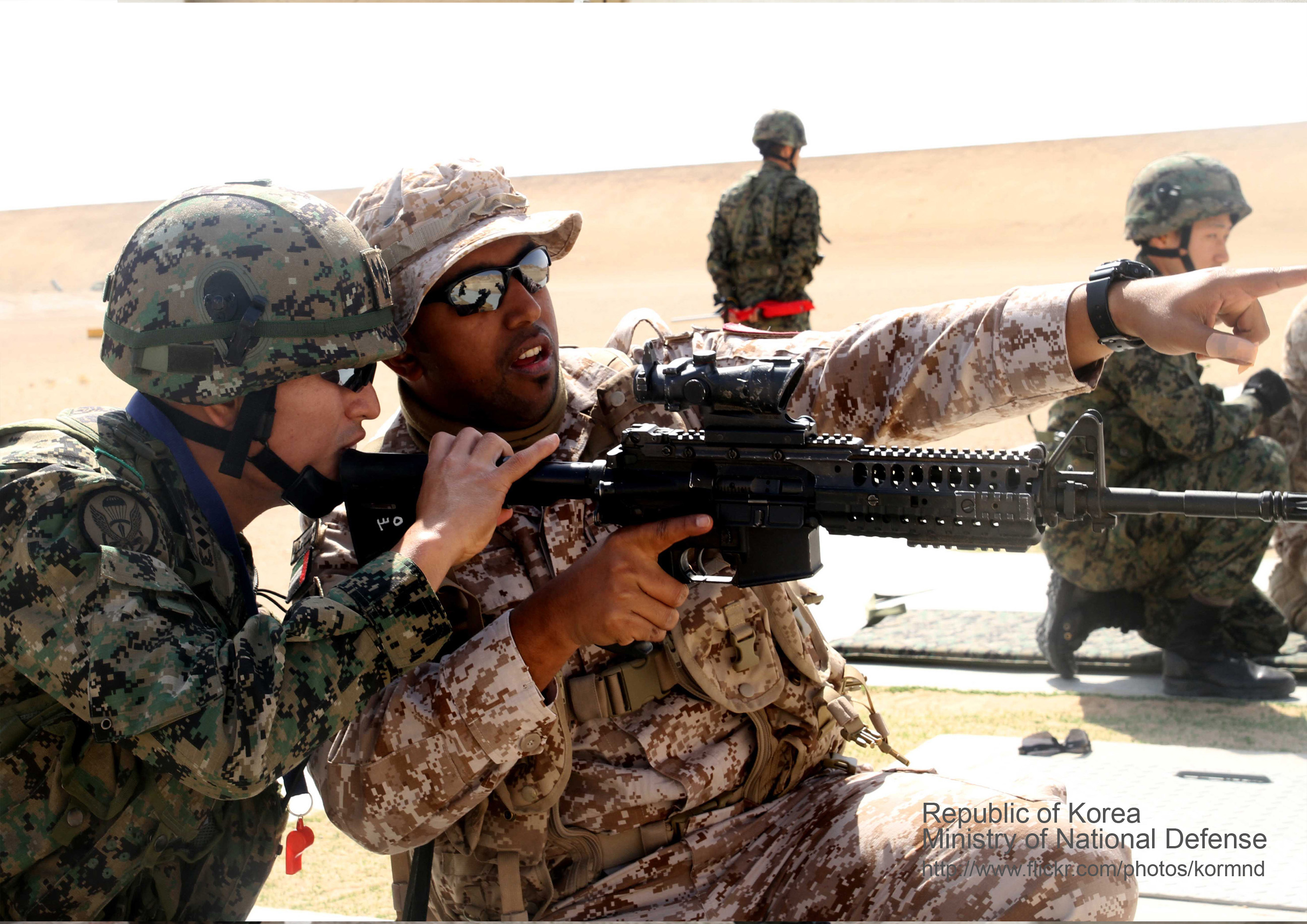
UAE army soldiers in a joint training exercise with South Korean soldiers in United Arab Emirates.

== History ==
From January 1993 to April 1994, UAE Armed Forces participated in humanitarian operations in Somalia under the United Task Force (UNITAF) and UN Operation in Somalia II (UNOSOM II). UAE land forces supplied a 640-man group in four rotations during this period. UAE and its Land Forces participated in the NATO-led International Security Assistance Force (ISAF) mission (2001-2014) and committed to contribute to the follow-on mission of ISAF; the Operation Resolute Support.

During the 2015 Yemeni Civil War, the United Arab Emirates Army (together with other GCC soldiers) intervened in support of fighters loyal to the ousted regime of Abd Rabbuh Mansur Hadi against Houthi militants. UAE troops assisted anti-Houthi fighters in the re-taking of Aden and Al Anad Air Base. On 4 September 2015, the army lost 52 soldiers in a war in Yemen to a tactical ballistic missile strike. UAE has since deployed an entire armoured brigade to Yemen. Up until November 2017, the UAE forces had 120 dead. On 3 May 2018, UAE deployed over 100 troops, artillery and armoured vehicles to the Yemeni archipelago of Socotra in Arabian Sea without prior coordination with the Government of Yemen. After landing, UAE forces expelled Yemeni soldiers stationed at some installations, including Socotra Airport and the flag of United Arab Emirates was raised above some government buildings in Hadibu.

== Equipment ==
The United Arab Emirates (UAE) Armed Forces are well-equipped with modern and advanced military hardware, sourced from various countries, primarily the United States, France, and the United Kingdom. The equipment covers a wide range of military platforms, including aircraft, naval vessels, armored vehicles, and sophisticated weaponry.

== Structure ==
There are 8 brigades and 1 battalion within the Union land forces of the UAE:

- Royal Guard Brigade
- 2 Armored Brigades
- 3 Mechanized Infantry Brigades
- 2 Infantry Brigades
- Artillery Brigade (3 Regiments)

The Emirate of Dubai maintains two additional Mechanized Infantry Brigades, which are not included in the Union force structure.
