= Escadron de Chasse 1/7 Provence =

Fighter Squadron 1/7 Provence
- Escadron de Chasse 1/7 Provence
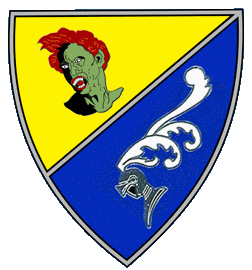
- Squadron insignia
- Active: October 1932 - present
- Country: France
- Branch: Armée de l'air et de l'espace
- Type: Fighter aircraft
- Role: Bombardment & Aerial Defense
- Part of: Air Forces Command
- Garrison/HQ: BA 104 Al Dhafra Air Base
- Engagements: World War II; Gulf War; 2026 Iran war

Escadron de Chasse 1/7 Provence (Fighter Squadron) is a French Air and Space Force (Armée de l'air et de l'espace) fighter squadron currently stationed at BA 104 Al Dhafra Air Base which flies the Dassault Rafale B & C.

In 2006 it was the first unit to fly the Dassault Rafale. The Squadron's aircraft are marked 113-HA to 113-HZ.

== History ==
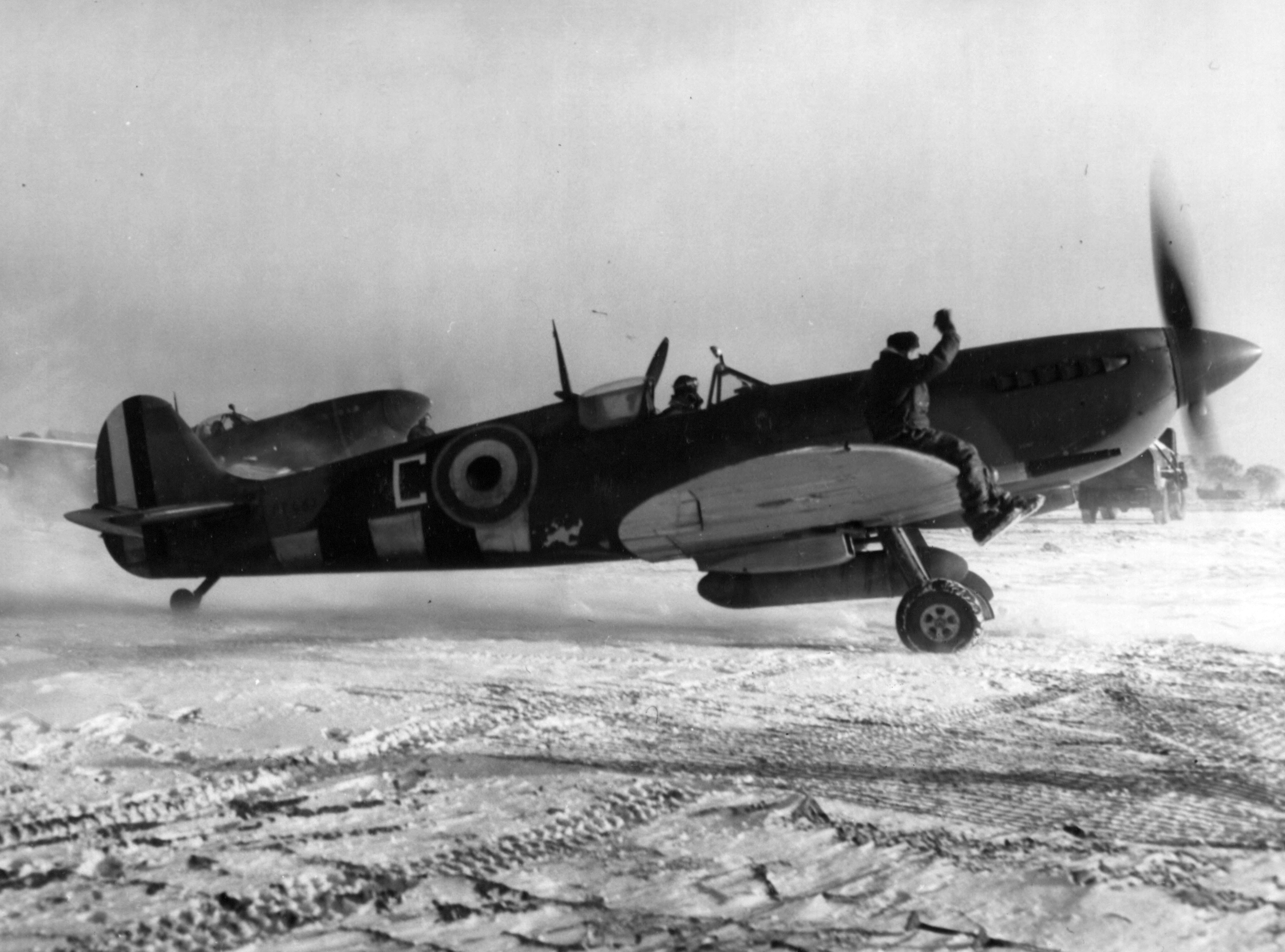
Spitfire IX of GC I/7, 1945

- Groupe de Chasse I/7 : from 1932 until October 1942
- Groupe de Chasse I/7 Provence : from November 1, 1943 until July 1, 1947
- Groupe de Chasse I/1 Provence : from July 1, 1947 until November 17, 1951
- Escadron de Chasse 1/7 Provence : as of March 1, 1962

=== Origins until the Second World War ===
The EC 1/7 Provence originated as Groupe de Chasse 1/7 GC 1/7 (Fighter Group) Dijon in 1932. In turn, it traces its own origin back to two World War I squadrons: Escadrille Spa.15 and Escadrille Spa.77. In January 1939 the fighter group 1/7 relocated to Tunisia, and subsequently moved to Egypt after the 1940 armistice. It was disbanded in October 1942.

Successive attachments included:

- 1ere Escadre de Chasse (French: 1^{ere} Escadre de chasse) : du 1 au 17
- 7e Escadre de Chasse (French: 7^{e} Escadre de chasse) : du 1 au 22
- 4e Escadre de Chasse (French: 4^{e} Escadre de chasse) : du 26 au 24

=== Indochina and Algeria ===
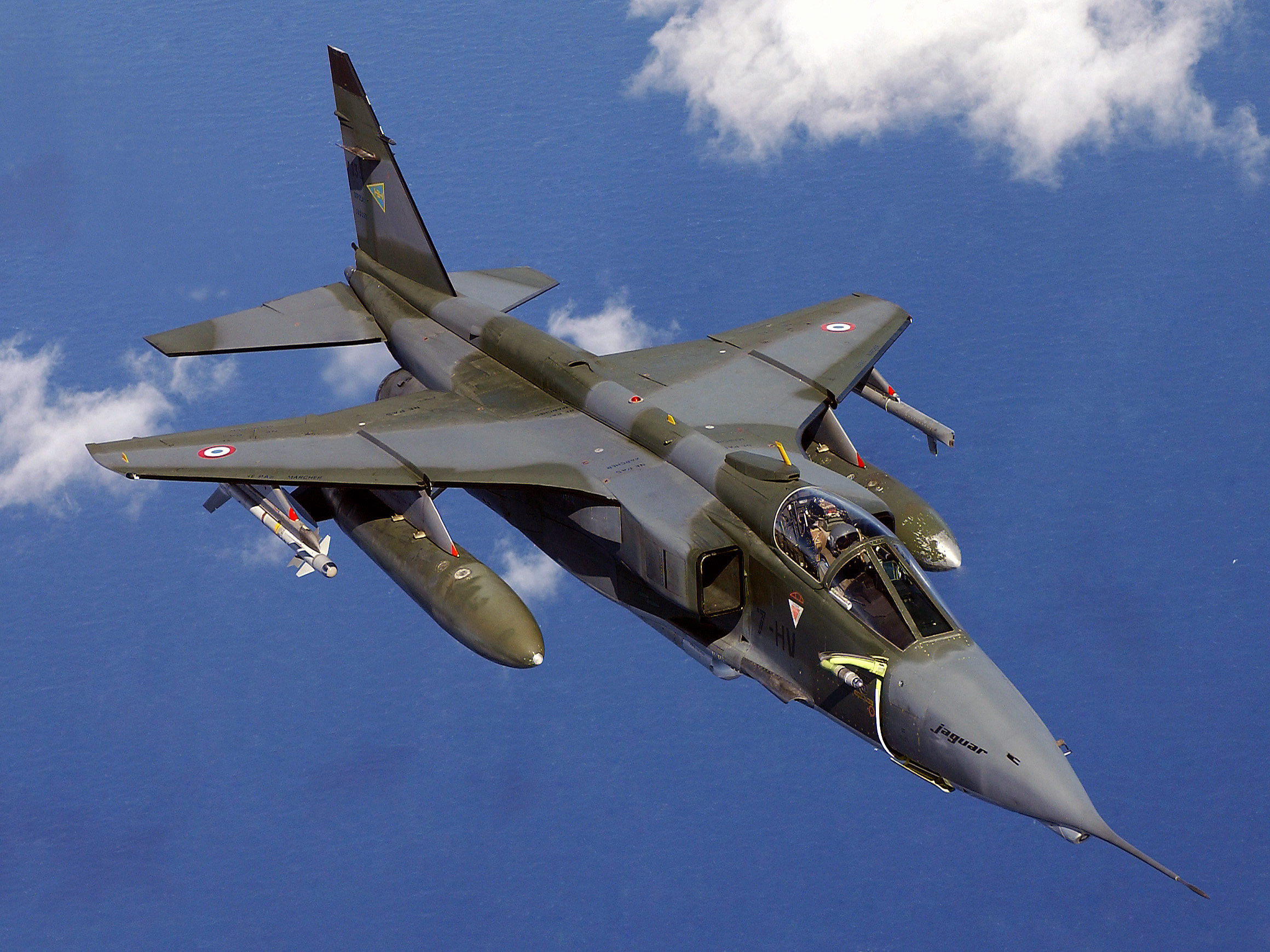
A SEPECAT Jaguar of EC 1/7 in 2003

GC 1/7 was recreated in September 1943 as No. 328 Squadron RAF flying Spitfire Mark VB aircraft and participated in the North Africa campaign, the campaign to liberate Corsica and the Operation Dragoon, the landings in Provence, thus prompting the name Provence. At the end of World War II, the unit was awarded the "Croix de guerre 1939–1945 (France)" and from December 1945 to January 1946, it received a consignment of captured Japanese Nakajima Ki-43 "Hayabusa" fighter planes. Groupe de Chasse 1/7 received its first Mistral in April 1953, participated in the Algerian War and was reequipped with Dassault Mystère IV operating out of Dijon military base. It was disbanded in September 1961.

Escadron de Chasse 1/7 Provence was recreated in March 1962 at Nancy – Ochey Air Base (Air Base 133), using Mystère IV. In 1973, the Squadron became the first Air force unit to be equipped with the SEPECAT Jaguar and relocated to BA 113 Saint-Dizier – Robinson Air Base. 1/7 Provence Jaguars engaged in combat missions in Mauritania (1978), in Chad (1980's), in the Gulf War (1990-1991) and in Bosnia. After the Escadron de Chasse 2/11 Vosges was disbanded, 1/7 Provence was expanded to 3 flights: la SPA 91 (Eagle on a skull) in December 1996.

=== The Jaguar (JAG) era ===
In July 2001 the squadron received several two-seat Jaguars and the Dassault/Dornier Alpha Jets previously used by Escadron de Chasse 2/7 Argonne.

=== The Rafale era ===
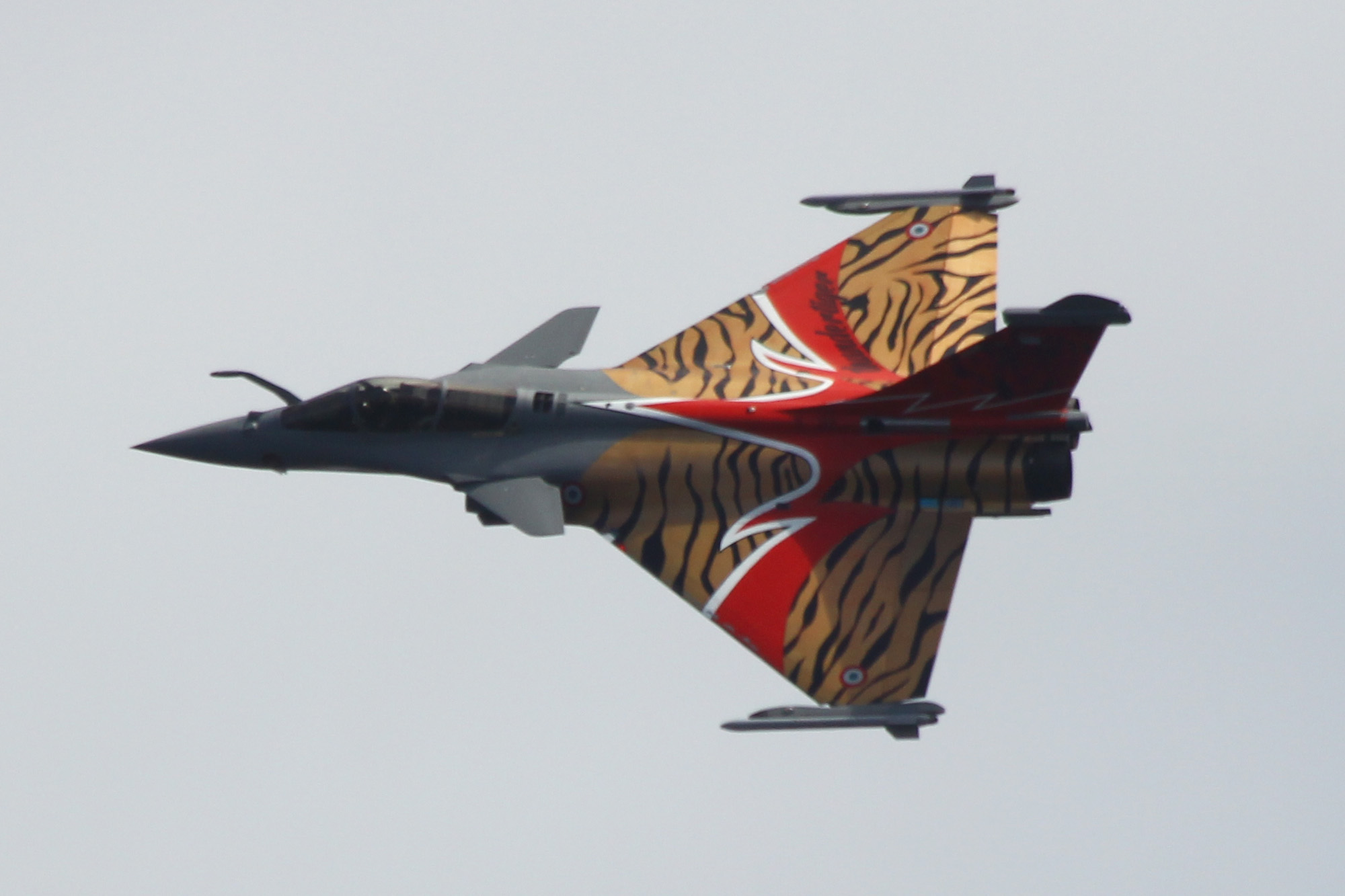
Rafale of EC 1/7 at Tigermeet 2014

The Jaguars were retired in July 2005 and replaced by Dassault Rafale one year later. In January 2007 1/7 Provence had twenty Rafale B and C. In March 2007 three Rafales were deployed to Dushanbe in Tajikistan, and carried out their first patrol over Afghanistan two days later.

In September 2007, 1/7 Provence Squadron's Alpha Jets were transferred to the newly recreated Escadron d'Entraînement 3/8 Côte d'Or (EE 3/8 Côte d'Or).

In June 2016, 1/7 Provence Squadron's Rafales were forward deployed to BA 104 Al Dhafra Air Base. In February 2026, following the outbreak of the 2026 Iran war, the squadron's Rafales were mobilized for air defense operations against Iranian drone and missile attacks targeting French and allied facilities in the region.

== Constituent Escadrilles ==
- Escadrille 15
- Escadrille Spa.77
- GC III/7(6) Furie (since August 24, 2016)

== Bases ==
- BA 113 Saint-Dizier – Robinson Air Base
- Haguenau Airport: From December 25, 1944 until January 2, 1945
- Po Chen Tong Air Base : from November 17, 1945 until July 1, 1947
- Aerial Base 141 Oran la Sénia (French: fr:Base aérienne 141 Oran la Sénia) : from April 1947 until end of 1950
- Aerial Base 156 Bizerte Sidi Ahmed (French: fr:Base aérienne 156 Bizerte Sidi Ahmed) : end of 1950 until December 1961 de fin 1950 à décembre 1961
- BA 133 Nancy – Ochey Air Base : from December 1961 until May 1973
- BA 113 Saint-Dizier – Robinson Air Base : from May 1973 until June 24, 2016
- BA 104 Al Dhafra Air Base : since June 24, 2016

== Aircraft ==
- Nakajima Ki-43 II Hayabusa (from 1945 to 1946)
- Supermarine Spitfire (from 1943 to 1953)
- De Havilland Vampire (from 1953 to 1962)
- Dassault Mystère IV (from 1962 to 1973)
- SEPECAT Jaguar (from 1973 to 2005)
- Dassault/Dornier Alpha Jet (2001–2007, aircraft marked 7-PA to 7-PZ)
- Dassault Rafale (since 2006)

== Bibliography ==
- Bergese, Francis (July 1971). "La 7^{e} Escadre de Chasse fête ses 100.000 H sur "Mystère"" [The 7th Fighter Squadron Celebrates 100,000 Hours on the "Mystère"]. Le Album de Fanatique de l'Aviation (in French) (24): 16–17. ISSN 0757-4169.
- Bergese, Francis (July 1971). "GC I/7: Le livre de bord de deux escadrilles de chasse célèbres" [The Logbooks of Two Famous Fighter Squadrons]. Le Album de Fanatique de l'Aviation (in French) (24): 18–19. ISSN 0757-4169.
- Franks, Norman; Bailey, Frank (1993). Over the Front: The Complete Record of the Fighter Aces and Units of the United States and French Air Services, 1914–1918 London, UK: Grub Street Publishing. ISBN 978-0-948817-54-0.
