= Fort des Adelphes =

Fortification in Épinal, France

- Part of Séré de Rivières system, Fortified Region of Épinal
- France
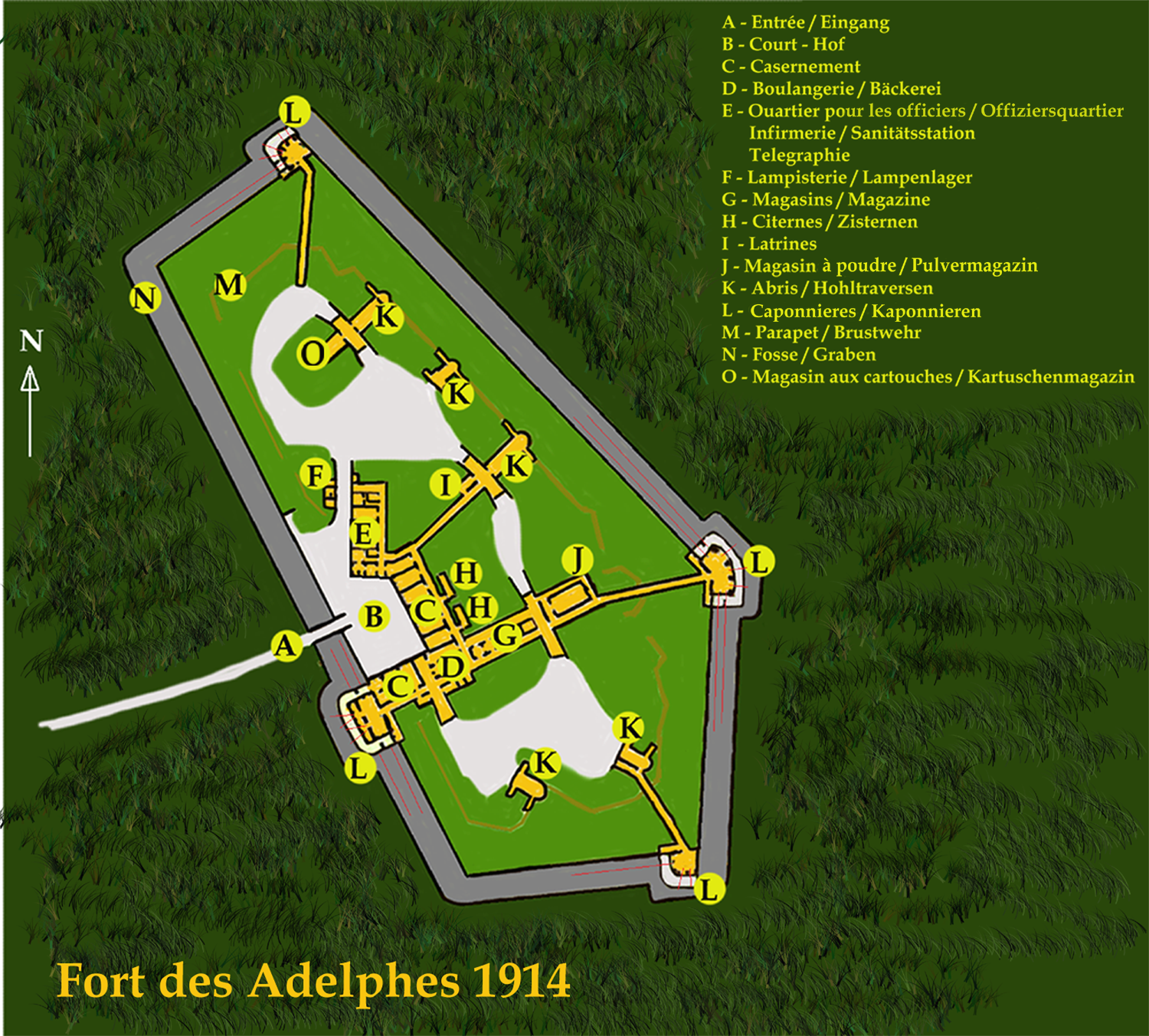
- Map in 1914.

Site information
- Type: Fort
- Owner: French Air Force
- Controlled by: France
- Open to the public: No
- Condition: Altered

Location
- Coordinates: 48.18796°N 6.4966°E

Site history
- Built: 1883
- Materials: Brick, stone, concrete
- Battles/wars: Battle of France

The Fort des Adelphes, or Fort Richepance, is part of the fortifications of Épinal. It was built near the village of Deyvillers between 1883 and 1885, and was modernized beginning in 1907. It is an example of a Séré de Rivières system fortification. During World War II the fort surrendered to German forces and was then used by the Germans to fire on neighboring forts Longchamp and Dogneville. The fort is now occupied by an activity of the French Air Force associated with Base aerienne 133 Nancy-Ochey and is not accessible to the public.

Located 3.75 kilometres (2.33 mi) northeast of Épinal, the Fort des Adelphes is part of a 43-kilometre (27 mi) line of sixteen major fortifications around Épinal designed to bar the advance of a German army into France.

== Description ==
The fort is situated at an altitude of 419 metres (1,375 ft), overlooking the road to Saint-Dié between the Fort de Razimont and the Deyvillers works. The fort is laid out as a walled pentagon, surrounded by a ditch. Construction extended from 1883 to 1885. The fort includes fortified barracks, storage facilities and magazines, and shelters for troops. The initial garrison comprised 235 men, and the construction cost of the original fort amounted to about 1.2 million francs. The principal armament consisted of five 155 mm and three 120 mm guns on the fort's ramparts.

The Fort des Adelphes was almost immediately improved with a concrete covered barracks for 150 men in 1892-1894. Between 1900 and 1906 a number of spiral queues de cochon or pig-tail infantry shelters were constructed around the fort. From 1907 to 1914 the fort was extensively reinforced, including the replacement of the caponiers guarding the ditch with more effective counterscarps, while a second reinforced barracks was added, along with a casemate de Bourges covering the ground in the direction of the ouvrage de Deyvillers.Between 1907 and 1909, armored observation positions and a 75mm gun turret were added. A third observation cupola and a machine gun turret were added in 1909-1910. Finally, the fort was connected to the electrical grid in 1913. The fort's garrison was by this time 400 troops.

Two 155mm gun turrets were planned for a battery located outside the walls of the fort, but work was stopped by the outbreak of war in 1914.

== History ==
The fort fired its 75mm gun turret at a German airplane during the First World War, but failed to hit the airplane. The fort fired on German troops in June 1940 during the Battle of France, but the fort surrendered to the Germans on 20 June and was then used to fire on its neighbors. The fort was stripped of equipment and armament in 1943.

== Status ==
The Fort des Adelphes was significantly altered in 1990 to support a French Air Force electronic warfare squadron 48/351. It continues in that role until 2014. From September 2018, it served as a training center for the 1st infantry regiment of Épinal which inaugurated on September 2, 2020 a Commando Initiation Center. The fort is not accessible to the public.
