= Escadron de Chasse 2/3 Champagne =

Fighter Squadron 2/3 Champagne
- Escadron de Chasse 2/3 Champagne
- Active: July 1, 1932 - present
- Country: France
- Branch: Armée de l'air et de l'espace
- Type: Fighter aircraft
- Role: Aerial Support; Aerial Bombardment
- Part of: 3^{e} Escadre de Chasse
- Garrison/HQ: Base Aérienne 133 Nancy – Ochey
- Engagements: World War II; Indochina War; Bosnian War; War in Afghanistan

Aircraft flown
- Fighter: Dassault Mirage 2000D

Escadron de Chasse 2/3 Champagne (Fighter Squadron 2/3 Champagne) is a French Air and Space Force (Armée de l'air et de l'espace) fighter squadron currently stationed at Base Aérienne 133 Nancy – Ochey (IATA: LFSO) which flies the Dassault Mirage 2000D.

== Denominations ==
- Groupe de Chasse (GC) I/5 (1932 - 1943)
- Groupe de Chasse I/5 Champagne (1944 - 1947)
- Groupe de Chasse II/3 Champagne (1947 - 1950)
- Escadron de Chasse (EC) 2/3 Champagne (1950 - ...)

== Escadrilles ==
From 1932 to 1992 :

- 1st Escadrille : Escadrille SPA 67 'Cigogne sur fanion' (Stork on flag)
- 2nd Escadrille : Escadrille SPA 75 'Charognard sable et or' (Sand and gold scavenger)

Since 1992 :

- 1st Escadrille : Escadrille SPA 67
- 2nd Escadrille : Escadrille SPA 75
- 3rd Escadrille : Escadrille SPA 102 'Soleil de Rhodes (Rhodes' Sun)

== Escadres ==
- 5e Escadre de Chasse (1932 - 1939)
- 3e Escadre de Chasse (1944 - ...)

== Aircraft flown ==
- Loire-Gourdou-Leseurre LGL 32 (1932 - 1936)
- Dewoitine D.500/ 501/ 510 (1936 - 1939)
- Curtiss H-75 (1939 - 1943)
- Curtiss P-40 Warhawk (1943 - 09/1943)
- Bell P-39 Airacobra (1943 - 1944)
- Republic P-47 Thunderbolt (1944–1948)
- Supermarine Spitfire (1948 - 1950)
- De Havilland DH 100 Vampire (1950 - 1951)
- Republic F-84 Thunderjet (1951 - 1956)
- Republic F-84F Thunderstreak (1955 - 1959)
- North American F-100 Super Sabre (1959 - 1965)
- Dassault Mirage IIIE (1965 - 1991)
- Dassault Mirage 2000N (1991 - 1998)
- Dassault Mirage 2000D (1998 - ...)

== See also ==
- List of French Air and Space Force aircraft squadrons
