= Escadron de Chasse 1/3 Navarre =

Fighter Squadron 1/3 Navarre
- Escadron de Chasse 1/3 Navarre
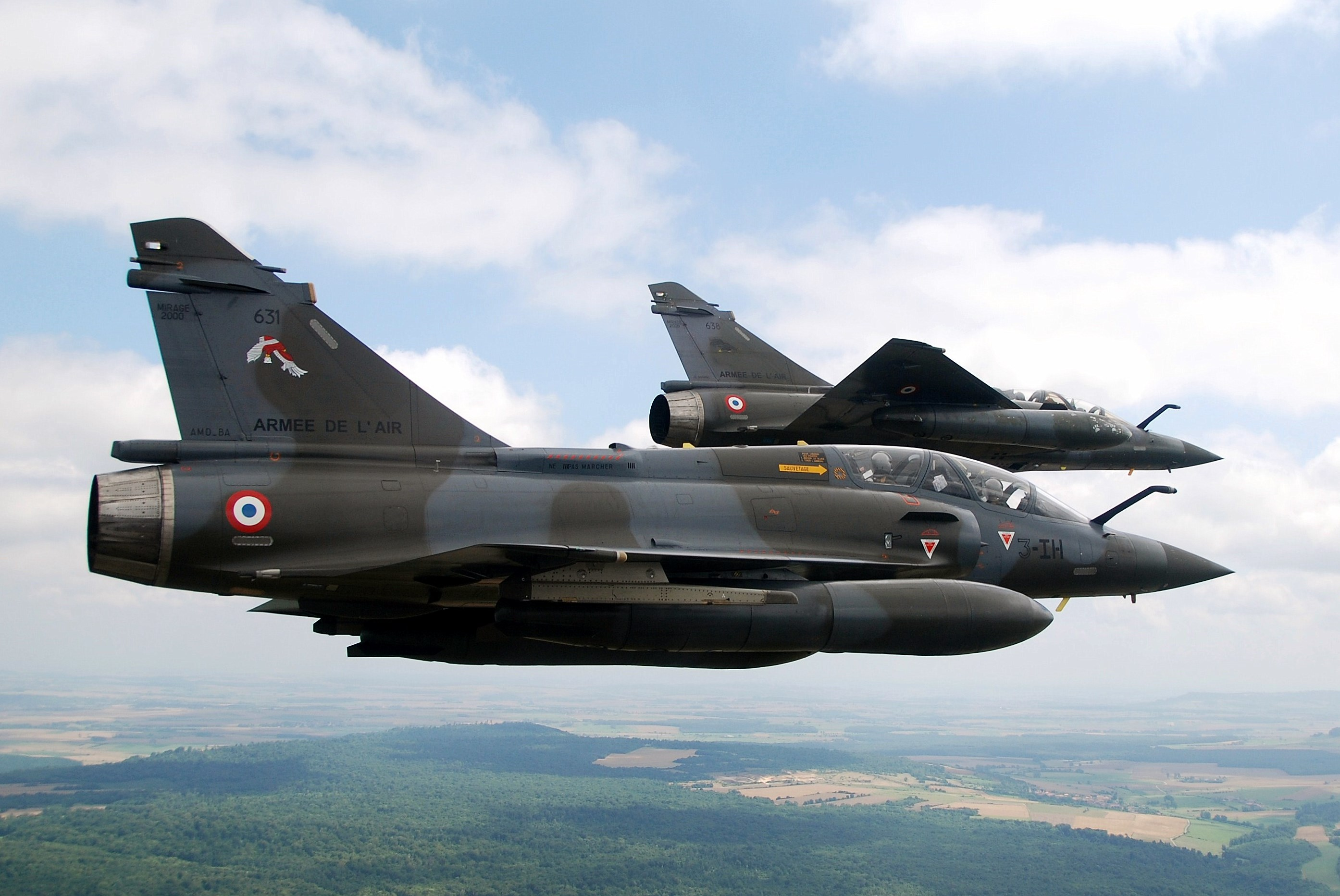
- Two Mirage 2000 D of the Squadron with the insignia of SPA 153.
- Active: 1943 - present
- Country: France
- Branch: Armée de l'air et de l'espace
- Type: Fighter aircraft
- Part of: 3e Escadre de Chasse
- Garrison/HQ: BA 133 Nancy – Ochey Air Base

Aircraft flown
- Fighter: Dassault Mirage 2000D

Escadron de Chasse 1/3 Navarre (Fighter Squadron 1/3 Navarre) is a French Air and Space Force (Armée de l'air et de l'espace) fighter squadron currently stationed at BA 133 Nancy – Ochey Air Base (IATA: LFSO) which flies the Dassault Mirage 2000D.

== See also ==
- List of French Air and Space Force aircraft squadrons
