= Nancy – Ochey Air Base =

Nancy - Ochey Air Base Base aérienne 133 Nancy-Ochey

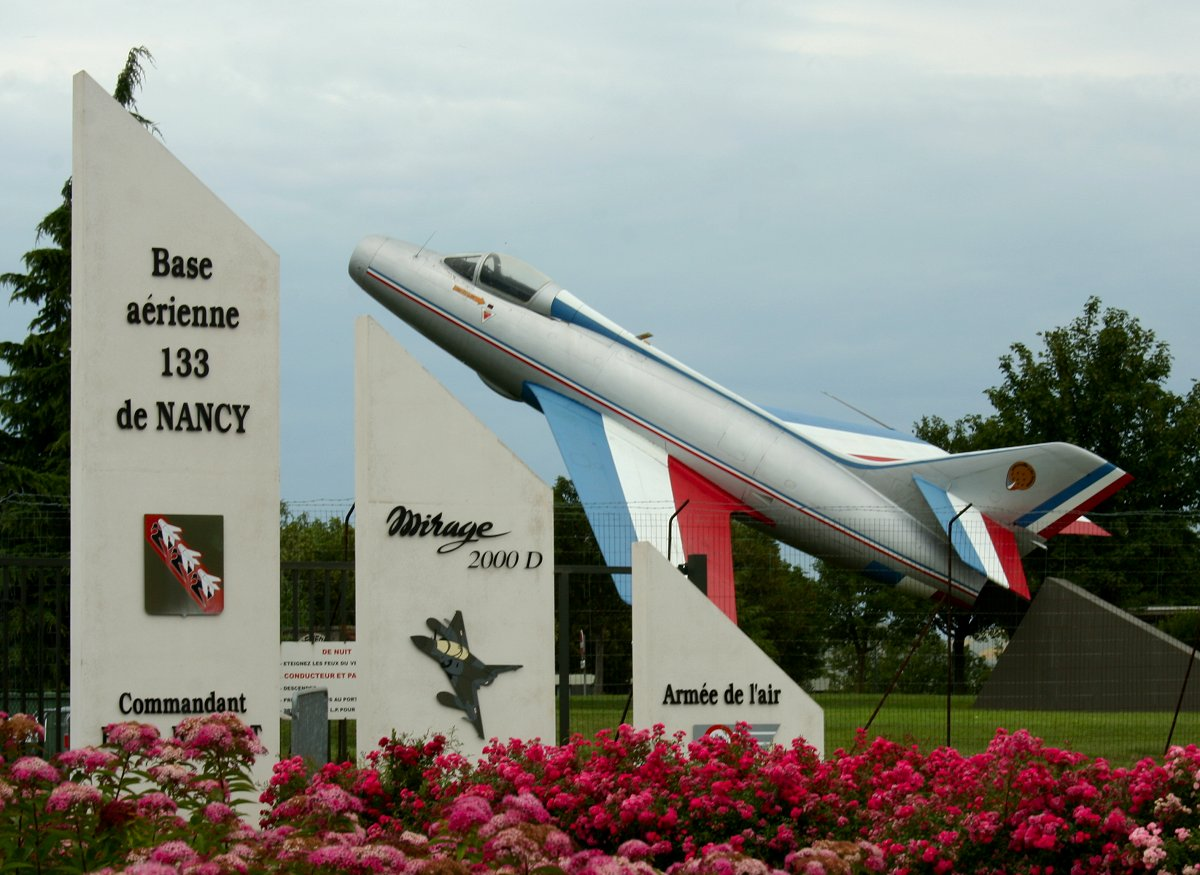
- IATA: none; ICAO: LFSO

Summary
- Airport type: Military
- Owner: Government of France
- Operator: Armée de l'air et de l'espace
- Location: Ochey, Meurthe-et-Moselle
- Elevation AMSL: 1,105 ft (337 m)
- Coordinates: 48°34′59″N 005°57′15″E

Map
- Location of Nancy – Ochey Air Base

Runways
Direction	Length		Surface
Direction	m	ft	Surface
02/20	2,400	7,874	Paved
- Source:World Aero Data

Nancy-Ochey Air Base (French: Base aérienne 133 Nancy-Ochey) (ICAO: LFSO) is a front-line French Air and Space Force (Armée de l'air et de l'espace) base located approximately 11 km west-southwest of Neuves-Maisons in the Département de Meurthe-et-Moselle, France.

== History ==
=== World War I, Interwar period and French Use in World War II ===
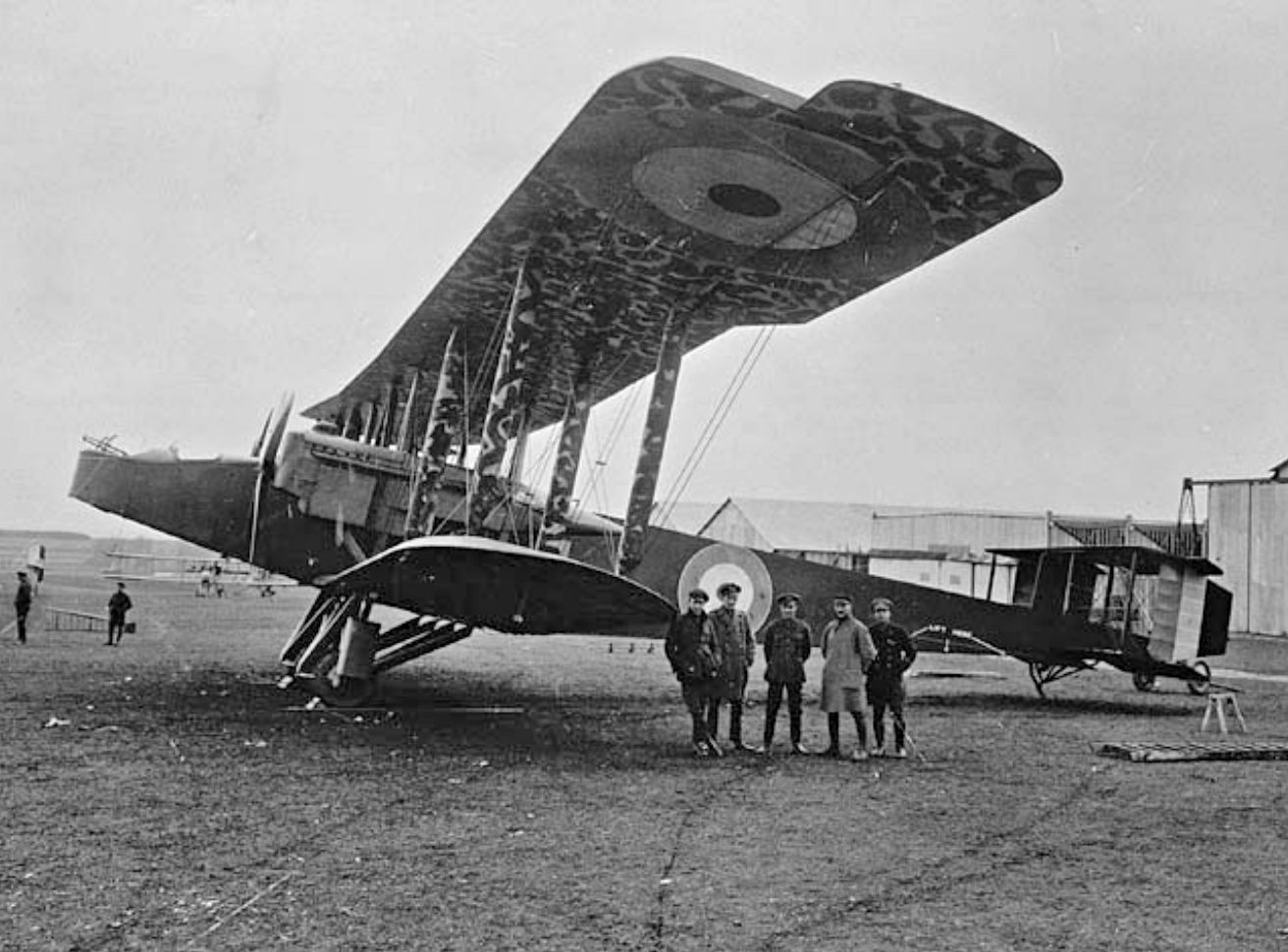
Handley Page O/100 at Ochey in March 1917

Ochey airfield was of particular importance to air operations during the latter stages of World War I. From at least March 1917 onwards it was used by No. 3 Wing Royal Naval Air Service (later No. 207 Squadron RAF), flying Handley Page O/100 bombers.

From October 1917 four HP O/100s of 'A' Squadron RNAS were joined with Nos. 55 Squadron (Airco DH4s) and 100 Squadron (FE2bs), to form No. 41 Wing of the Royal Flying Corps. Commanded by Lt.-Col. Cyril L Newall (later Marshal of the RAF Lord Newall, KCB, OM, CMG, CBE, AM), the wing flew a considerable number of sorties against strategic targets in Southwest Germany.

Nancy Air Base is a pre-World War II French Air and Space Force airfield.

In May 1940, it served as headquarter for the Zone D'Opérations Aériennes Est (ZOAE). This translates as Area of Air Operations - East. Aircraft assigned were:

- 1 Curtiss H-75 Hawk Single-engine Fighter
- 10 Potez 63.11 Twin-engined heavy fighters

=== German use during World War II ===
The base was seized by the Germans in June 1940 during the Battle of France. The Luftwaffe, however did not station any flying units at the airfield until April 1943, when a glider unit, Luftlandegeschwader 2 (LLG 2), equipped with Heinkel He 111s medium bombers being used to tow Gotha Go 242 transport gliders. LLG 2 moved out in June, being replaced by Luftlandegeschwader 1 (LLG 1) in September 1943, equipped with Dornier Do 17/DFS 230 gliders. The glider units remained until August 1944.

In the spring of 1944, as a result of the Luftwaffe going on a defensive footing as part of the "Defense of the Reich" campaign, Jagdgeschwader 26 (JG 26) moved to Nancy, equipped with Messerschmitt Bf 109G day interceptor fighters to attack the American Eighth Air Force heavy bomber fleets attacking targets in Occupied Europe and Germany.

The interceptors remained until June 1944, when they were moved out and replaced by Kampfgeschwader 53 (KG 53), a bomber unit which was moved in from the Eastern Front, flying Heinkel He 111s, the unit used the bombers to air launch the V-1 flying bomb. The Heinkels would carry the V-1 airborne and launch it, negating the need for a long launch ramp for the weapon.

KG 53 remained at Nancy until September when the Luftwaffe was removed from the base by the advancing United States Third Army moving east towards the Saarland.

=== Allied use ===
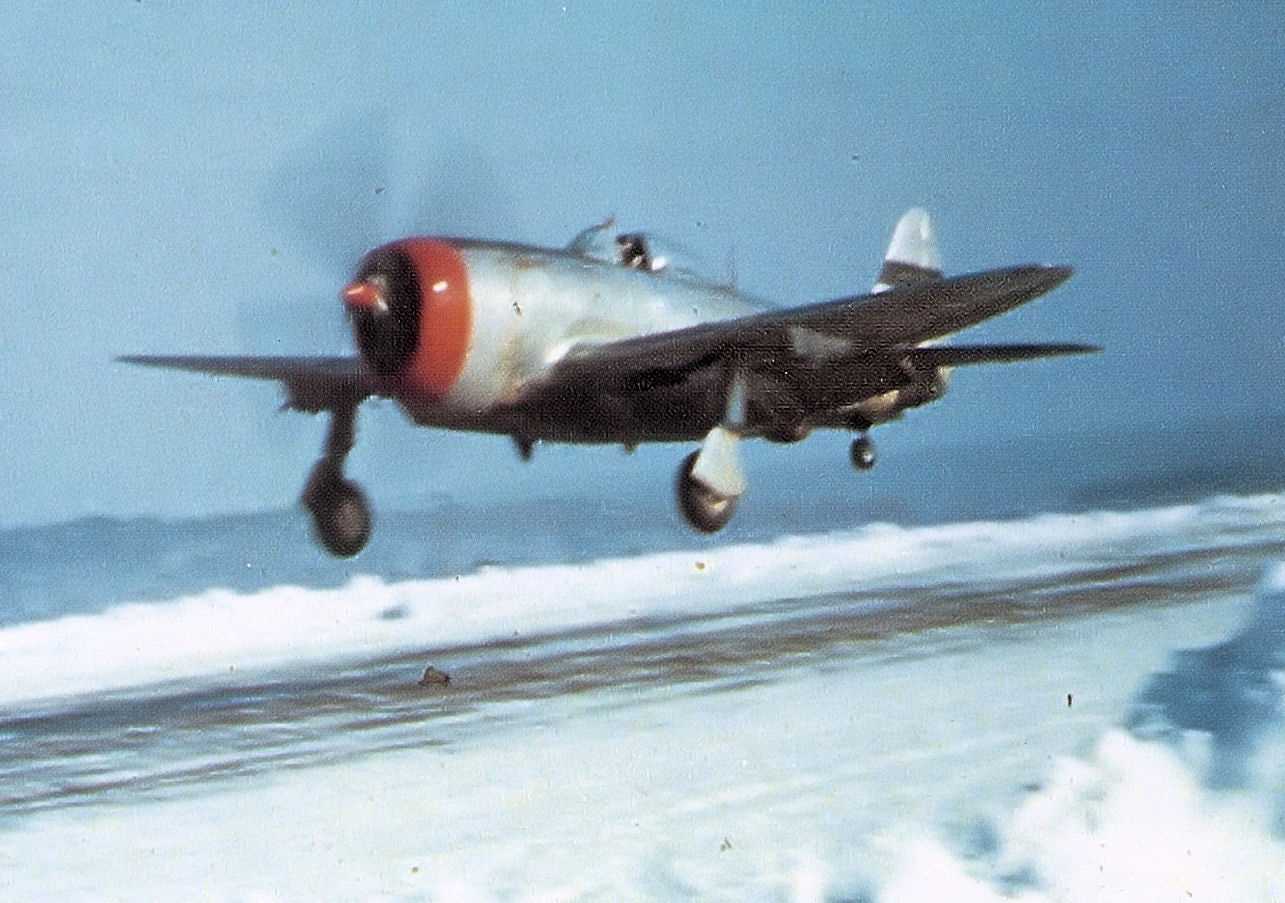
50th Fighter Group P-47 Thunderbolt landing at Toul/Ochey Airfield (A-96) in December 1944.

Nancy Air Base was liberated by Allied ground forces about 20 August 1944 during the Northern France Campaign. Almost immediately, the USAAF IX Engineering Command 826th Engineer Aviation Battalions began clearing the airport of mines and destroyed Luftwaffe aircraft, and repairing operational facilities for use by American aircraft. Subsequently, it became a USAAF Ninth Air Force combat airfield, designated as Advanced Landing Ground "A-96" Toul/Ochey Airfield about 29 August.

Under American control, Toul/Ochey was turned over to the Ninth Air Force, and the 50th Fighter Group moved into the repaired airfield on 3 November with three squadrons of Republic P-47 Thunderbolts, flying combat missions from the field until moving east into Germany in April 1945.

Also, during March and April 1945, the Twelfth Air Force 27th Fighter Group operated P-47s from the airfield. Another Twelfth Air Force unit, the 415th Night Fighter Squadron operated Bristol Beaufighters from the airfield between November 1944 and March 1945, flying night interceptor missions against Luftwaffe aircraft.

With the end of the war in Europe in May, 1945 the airfield became a central collection point for captured German aircraft as part of Operation Lusty. Various Luftwaffe aircraft, both piston and jet propelled were flown to Ochey for storage prior to being flown to airfields near Cherbourg where they were loaded on ships and sent to the United States. After Lusty began to phase down in the fall of 1945, the Americans began to withdraw their aircraft and personnel. Control of the airfield was turned over to French authorities on 5 November.

=== Cold War ===
During the early years of the Cold War, the French Government allocated Ochey airfield to the United States Air Force as an emergency NATO Dispersed Operating Base for its fighter aircraft stationed in France in the 1950s and 1960s.

=== Postwar and modern use ===
In French control after the war, Nancy-Ochey Air Base was completely rebuilt. The wartime east–west (07/25) concrete runway, severely damaged by the war was removed, and a modern 8000' asphalt jet runway was laid down 01/19. In addition, three circular marguerite (French for 'Daisy') system of hardstands that could be revetted later with earth for added protection were laid out, two on the north end of the runway and one on the south. Each marguerite consisted of fifteen to eighteen hardstands around a large central hangar, with each hardstand capable of one or two aircraft, and allowed the planes to be spaced approximately 150 feet (46 m) apart. Each squadron was assigned to a separate hangar/hardstand complex.

Today, Nancy Air Base is a front line French airfield, flying modern aircraft.

It is the home of 4 squadrons of Dassault Mirage 2000D multirole fighters (60 aircraft).

- 3e Escadre de Chasse

Escadron de Chasse 1/3 Navarre
SPA.95 Oriflamme chargé d'un Martinet
SPA.153 Gypaéte
SPA.62 Coq de Combat
Escadron de Chasse 2/3 Champagne
SPA.67 Cigogne de Navarre
SPA.75 Charognard
SPA.102 Soleil de Rhodes
Escadron de Chasse 3/3 Ardennes
1° Esc GC III/3 Hure Barre bleue
2° Esc GC III/3 Hure Barre rouge
BR.44 Sanglier assis ou Hure Barre verte

- Escadron de Transformation Mirage 2000D 4/3 Argonne

== See also ==
- List of French Air and Space Force aircraft squadrons
- Advanced Landing Ground
- Fort des Adelphes
