= Deyvillers =

- Commune
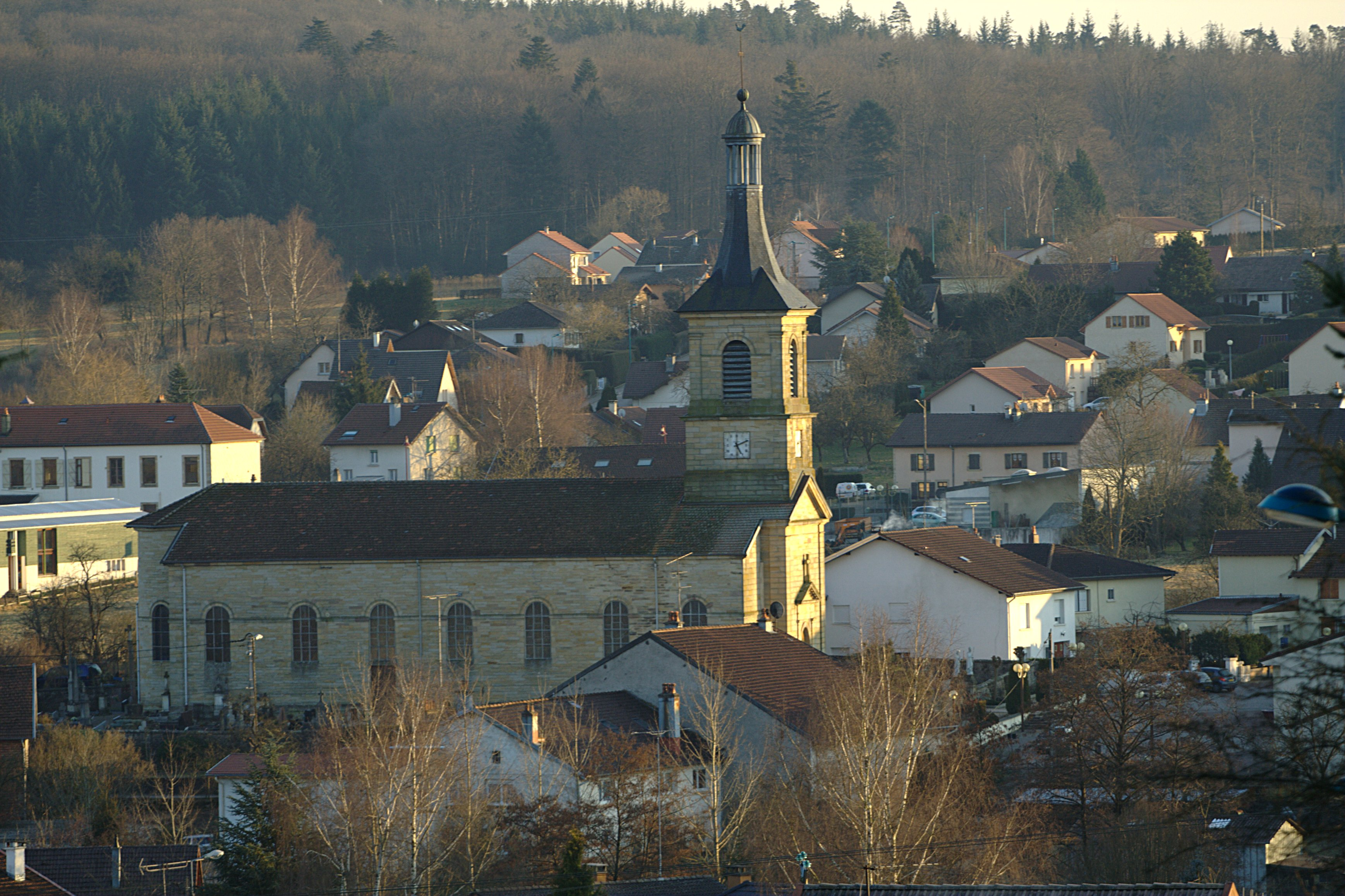
- The church in Deyvillers

- Coat of arms
- Location of Deyvillers
- Location within France Location within Grand Est
- Coordinates: 48°12′08″N 6°30′50″E
- Country: France
- Region: Grand Est
- Department: Vosges
- Arrondissement: Épinal
- Canton: Épinal-2
- Intercommunality: CA Épinal

Government
  - Mayor (2020–2026): Bruno Chevrier
- Area^{1}: 8.77 km^{2} (3.39 sq mi)
- Elevation: 403 m (1,322 ft)
- Highest elevation: 433 m (1,421 ft)
- Lowest elevation: 325 m (1,066 ft)
- Population (2023): 1,379
  - Density: 157/km^{2} (407/sq mi)
- Time zone: UTC+01:00 (CET)
  - Summer (DST): UTC+02:00 (CEST)
- INSEE/Postal code: 88132 /88000
- ^{1} French Land Register data, which excludes lakes, ponds, glaciers > 1 km^{2} (0.386 sq mi or 247 acres) and river estuaries.

Deyvillers (French pronunciation: [devile]) is a commune in the Vosges department in Grand Est in northeastern France.

== See also ==
- Communes of the Vosges department
- Fort des Adelphes
