= Al Dhafra Air Base =

Emirati military air base

- قاعدة الظفرة الجوية
- Al Dhafra, Abu Dhabi in the United Arab Emirates
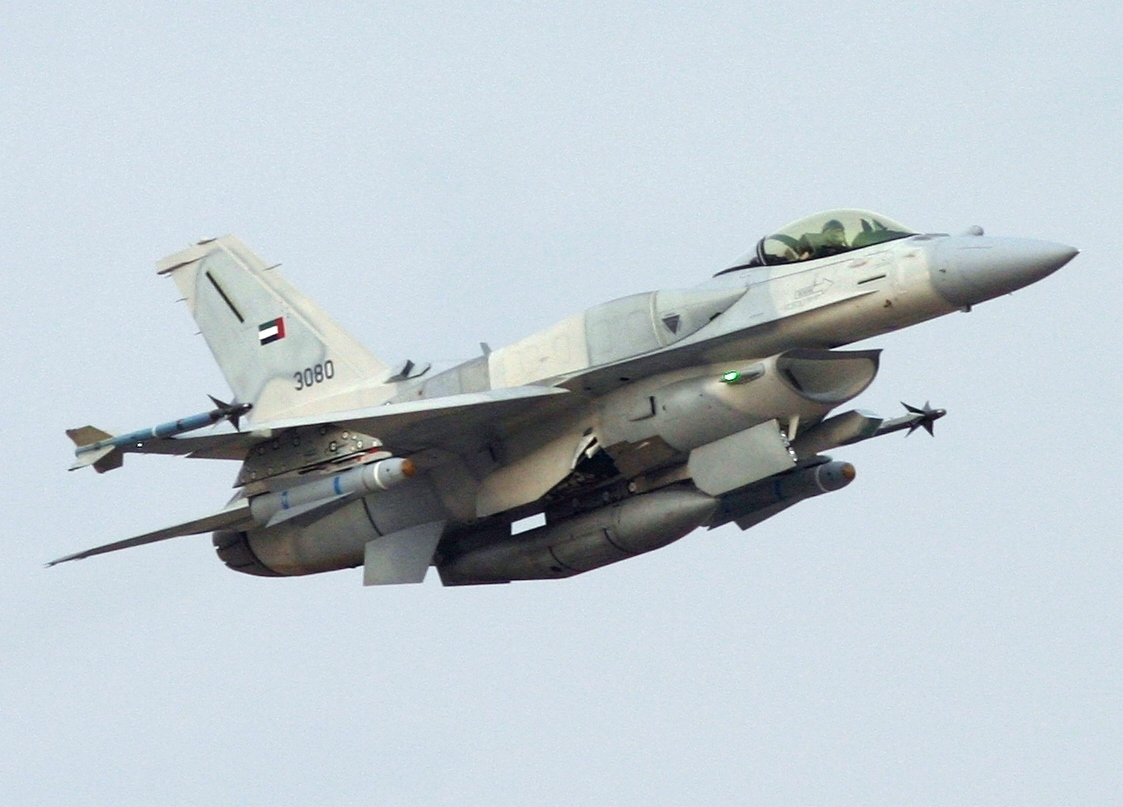
- A United Arab Emirates Air Force F-16E Desert Falcon of the type based at Al Dhafra AB

- Emblem of the United Arab Emirates Air Force

Site information
- Type: UAE Air Force base
- Owner: United Arab Emirates Armed Forces
- Operator: United Arab Emirates Air Force (UAEAF)
- Controlled by: Western Air Command
- Condition: Operational

Location
- Location in the United Arab Emirates
- Coordinates: 24°14′24″N 054°32′54″E

Site history
- Built: 1983
- In use: 1983 – present

Garrison information
- Garrison: Fighter Wing (UAEAF); Escadron de Chasse 1/7 Provence (French Air and Space Force); 380th Air Expeditionary Wing (USAF)

Airfield information
- Identifiers: IATA: DHF, ICAO: OMAM
- Elevation: 23 metres (75 ft) AMSL
Runways
Direction	Length and surface
13L/31R	3,661 metres (12,011 ft) Asphalt
13R/31L	3,661 metres (12,011 ft) Asphalt
- Sources: World Aero Data

Al Dhafra Air Base (ADAB, Arabic: قاعدة الظفرة الجوية, IATA: DHF, ICAO: OMAM) is a military installation in the United Arab Emirates. The base is located approximately 20 mi (32 km) south of Abu Dhabi, and is operated by the United Arab Emirates Air Force.

== History ==
The base was attacked by the Houthis in January 2022. An Emirati THAAD intercepted a midrange ballistic missile on January 17 and two missiles aimed at the base were intercepted and destroyed on January 24 by Patriot missiles. The interception by the THAAD marked the system’s first known use in a military operation.

The base was attacked again during the 2026 Iran war by a missile, causing damage to the base.

== Facilities ==
The airport sits at an elevation of 77 ft (23 m) above mean sea level. It has two runways, 13L/31R and 13R/31L, each with an asphalt surface measuring 3,661 m × 46 m (12,011 ft × 151 ft).

== Role and operations ==
=== United Arab Emirates Air Force ===
The air base is the headquarters of the Western Air Command of the United Arab Emirates Air Force. It hosts the UAE Air Force Fighter Wing, comprising the 1st Shaheen Squadron, 2nd Shaheen Squadron, and 3rd Shaheen Squadron, which is equipped with the Lockheed Martin F-16E/F Desert Falcon. The base is also home to the 71st and 76th Fighter Squadrons which operate the Dassault Mirage 2000-9EAD/DAD.

=== Military intervention against ISIL ===
==== United States ====
Al Dhafra hosts the United States Air Force's 380th Air Expeditionary Wing (380 AEW), established at the base in January 2002. The 380 AEW's mission is to carry out combat operations to provide high-altitude all-weather intelligence, surveillance, reconnaissance, airborne command and control and aerial refueling for military operations against ISIL/ISIS (referred to by the US military as Operation Inherent Resolve) and previously, NATO-led operations in Afghanistan (Operation Resolute Support).

The wing has operated the F-15C Eagle, F-15E Strike Eagle, F-22A Raptor, KC-10A Extender, E-3 Sentry (AWACS) U-2S Dragon Lady and EQ-4 and RQ-4 Global Hawk. The first USAF F-35 Lightning II deployed to the Middle East was deployed to Al Dhafra Air Base in April 2019.

While the US military presence at the base dates back to the early 1990s, it was only officially acknowledged by the US Air Force in August 2017.

As of 2020, contractor activity at Al Dhafra on behalf of the US military includes work done by Abacus Technology Corp. information technology, Centurum information technology, in addition to various construction projects.

==== France ====
In September 2008, the French Air Force opened its own military settlement in the northwest corner of the base, operating Dassault Mirage 2000-5Fs.

With military operations against ISIL/ISIS, the French deployed Breguet Atlantique II maritime patrol aircraft as part of Opération Chammal.

== Based units ==
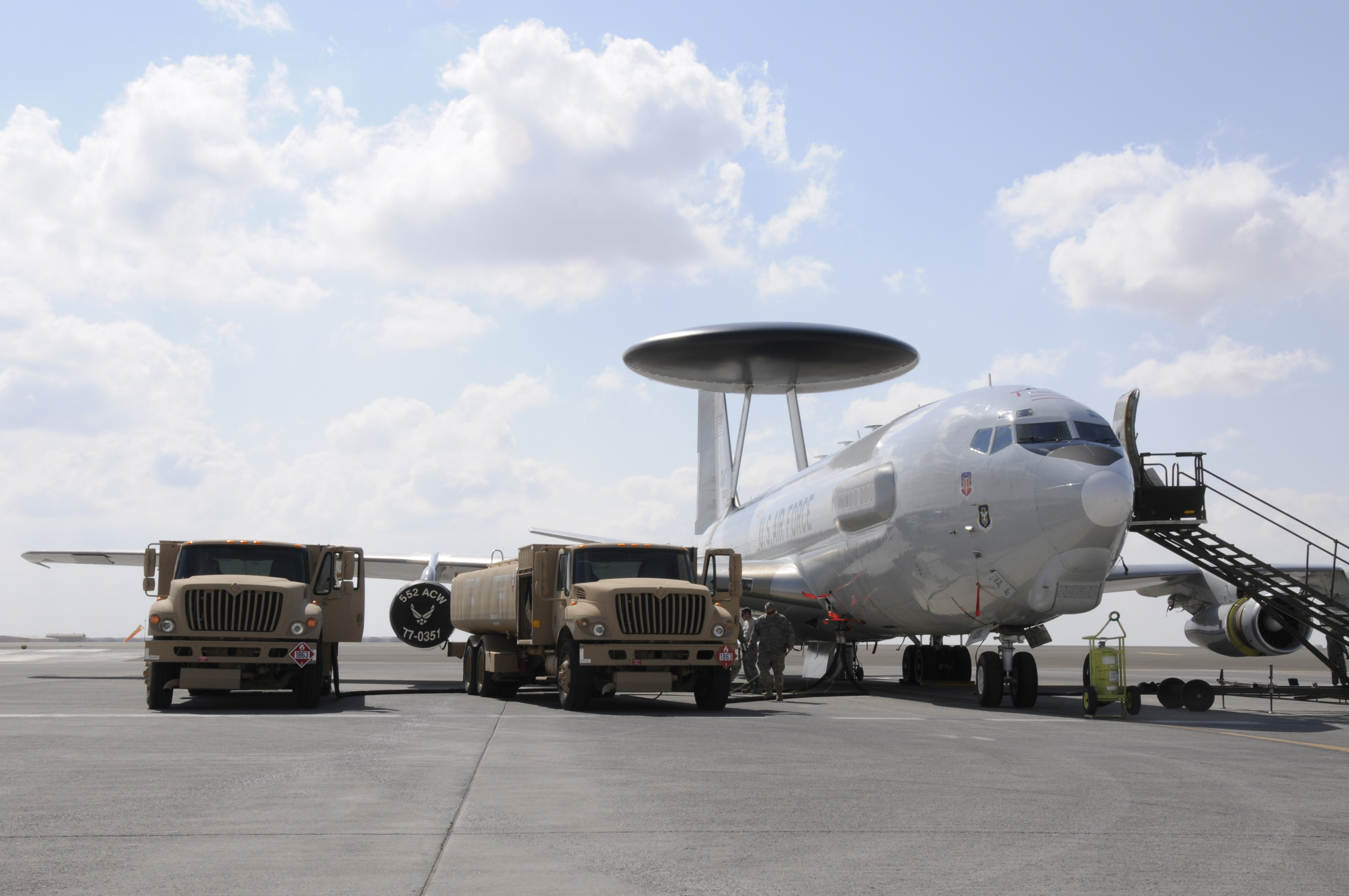
Two R-11 fuel trucks refuel an E-3 Sentry of the 380th Air Expeditionary Wing, 2009

Notable units based at Al Dhafra Air Base.

=== United Arab Emirates Air Force ===
Western Air Command

- Fighter Wing
  - 71 Squadron – Mirage 2000-9EAD/9DAD
  - 76 Squadron – Mirage 2000-9EAD/9DAD
  - 1st Shaheen Squadron – F-16E/F Desert Falcon
  - 2nd Shaheen Squadron – F-16E/F Desert Falcon
  - 3rd Shaheen Squadron – F-16E/F Desert Falcon

=== French Air and Space Force ===
(Al Dhafra 'Lieutenant-Colonel Charles Pijeaud' Air Base)

- Escadron de Chasse 1/7 Provence with the Dassault Rafale from June 2016
  - Previously:
    - Escadron de Chasse 1/2 Cigognes with the Dassault Mirage 2000-5F (2008-2010)
    - Escadron de Chasse 3/30 Lorraine with the Rafale (2010-2016)

=== United States Air Force ===
Air Combat Command

- US Air Forces Central Command
  - Air Forces Central Air Warfare Center
  - 380th Air Expeditionary Wing
    - 380th Expeditionary Operations Group
      - Various Expeditionary Fighter Squadrons – F-15C Eagle, F-15E Strike Eagle, F-22 Raptor, F-35A Lightning II
      - 99th Expeditionary Reconnaissance Squadron – U-2 Dragon Lady
      - 380th Expeditionary Operations Support Squadron
      - 908th Expeditionary Air Refueling Squadron – KC-10A Extender
      - 968th Expeditionary Airborne Air Control Squadron – E-3 Sentry
    - 380th Air Expeditionary Maintenance Group
      - 380th Expeditionary Aircraft Maintenance Squadron
      - 380th Expeditionary Maintenance Squadron
      - 380th Expeditionary Munitions Squadron
    - 380th Air Expeditionary Mission Support Group
      - 380th Expeditionary Civil Engineer Squadron
      - 380th Expeditionary Communications Squadron
      - 380th Expeditionary Contracting Squadron
      - 380th Expeditionary Force Support Squadron
      - 380th Expeditionary Logistics Readiness Squadron
      - 380th Expeditionary Security Forces Squadron
    - 380th Air Expeditionary Medical Squadron
  - 1st Expeditionary Civil Engineer Group
    - 577th Expeditionary Prime BEEF Squadron
    - 557th Expeditionary RED HORSE Squadron

The 380th AEW is also known to operate the EQ-4B and RQ-4B Global Hawk.

=== United States Army ===
US Army Forces Command

- 32nd Army Air and Missile Defense Command
  - 11th Air Defense Artillery Brigade
    - 43rd Air Defense Artillery Regiment
      - 1st Battalion – MIM-104 Patriot
