= 3e Escadre de Chasse =

3^{e} Escadre de Chasse 3rd Fighter Wing
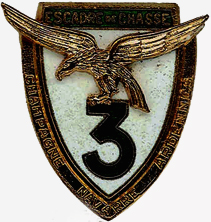
- Insignia of the Escadre
- Active: September 4, 2014 - present
- Country: France
- Branch: French Air and Space Force
- Type: Fighter aircraft unit
- Part of: Fighter Brigade (France)
- Equipment: Miarge 2000D

The 3^{e} Escadre de Chasse 3^{e} EC or 3rd Fighter Wing is a fighter formation of the Fighter Brigade (French: Brigade Aérienne de l'Aviation de Chasse) of the French Air and Space Force.

== History ==
=== Second World War ===
The 3rd Fighter Wing was formed on January 1, 1944, as part of the Free French Air Forces under Commandant Monraisse. The unit was constituted of Fighter Groups (GC) I/4 Navarre, GC I/5 Champagne, and GC III/6 Rousillon and flew the P-39 Airacobra. GC I/5 Champagne received a visit from Genéral Charles de Gaulle at Oran-La Senia on April 13, 1944. In May 1944, the wing reequipped with the P-39Q.

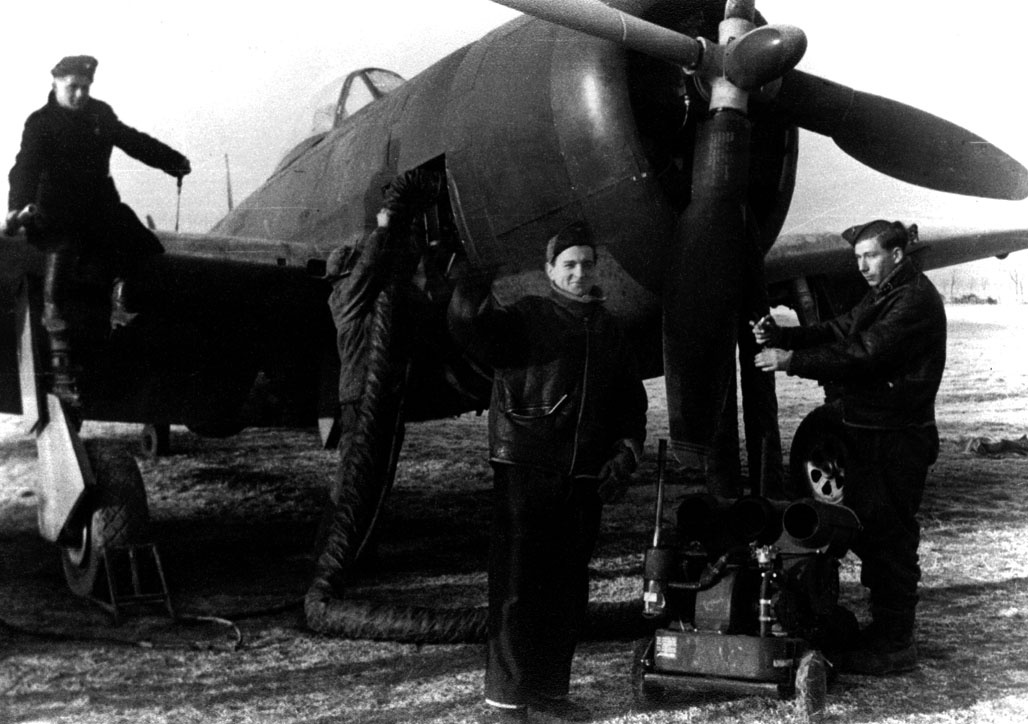
P-47 du 3/3 Ardennes.

The I/4 Navarre was temporary attached to the EC 4 on June 1, 1944. Between July 17, 1944, and the end of October 1944, the Wing was reinforced with the GC III/3 Ardennes fighter squadron, flying the P-47, as well. GC I/4 Navarre joined the 3rd Fighter Wing on December 7, 1944. In the meantime, the latter reequipped with the P-47 Thunderbolt.

Following disembarkation in Provence, the wing landed on Salon-de-Provence on September 30, 1944. Soon the wing moved to Vallon, situated at a dozen of kilometers.

The 1st French Aerial Corps, made up of the 1st, 3rd, and 4th Fighter Wings was formed on December 1, 1944. The Navarre and Champagne squadrons were based at Aerial Base 278 Ambérieu-en-Bugey. The Wing arrived at Dole towards the end of December 1944. The "Champagne" squadron lost its commander, Marin la Meslée, on February 4, 1945.

The wing arrived in Bordeaux as of April 12, 1945, to participate to the clearing of Royan Pocket and Pointe de Grave (French: poche de Royan). The latter went back east on April 23, 1945, to garrison at Strasbourg-Entzheim Airport near Strasbourg.

The Wing conducted its last war missions on May 1, 1945, the bad climatic conditions then preventing the P-47 to take off until the signature of the cease-fire, on May 8, 1945. The Wing flew over the Champs-Élysées on May 9, 1945.

=== Germany ===
After a couple of months in Alsace, the Wing garrisoned at the field of Trier in Germany. The latter garrisoned there for twenty one months before rejoining Aerial Base 136 Friedrichshafen end of May 1947.

The squadrons changed the designation on July 1, 1947, while becoming GC.1/3 Navarre and GC.2/3 Champagne.

In June 1948, the pilots underwent training Spitfire Mk.IX on the Aerial Base 141 Oran la Sénia, based on the 1^{er} Escadre de Chasse. On August 1, 1948, an arms ceremony (French: prise d'armes) was held to celebrate the departure of the Wing to Indochina.

=== Indochina ===
Navarre embarked on September 3, 1948, on the Pasteur and arrived at the end of month to Indochina at Haiphong. The latter recuperated the Spitfire barely rested from pilots of the 4th Fighter Wing. The 1st Escadrille (French: 1^{re} Escadrille) (SPA95) garrisoned at the field of Hano Gia Lam. The 2nd Escadrille (French: 2^{e} Escadrille) garrisoned accordingly on the field of Saigon Aerial Base 191 Tan-Son-Nhut.

The "Champagne" squadron disembarked to the turn in Indochina on December 28, 1948. The command post of the latter was installed at Nha Trang, the 1st Escadrille was based at Tourane and the 2nd Escadrille at Tan Son Nhut.

The 5th Fighter Wing arrived in Indochina as of end of July 1949 to relieve the 3rd Wing. The 1/3 Squadron embarked on the Champollion end of November 1949 to return to France, followed by the 2/3 in April 1950.

=== The first jets ===
Upon return from Indochina, the Escadre was reformed at Aerial Base 11 Reims-Champagne. Pilots went to Aerial Base 118 Mont-de-Marsan to conduct their transition on the Vampire.

On September 1, 1950, the hunter groups (French: groupes de chasse) adopted their designation referral as actual hunter squadron (French: escadron de chasse). In February 1951, the « la 3 » passed on the Republic F-84E Thunderjet, with the last Vampire flat taking lieu on March 29, 1951. The Escadre flew equally on the F-84G version.

On January 1, 1953, the Escadre gained an additional squadron with the activation of the Escadron the Chasse 3/3 Ardennes. The first Republic F-84F Thunderstreak flew with the "3" on May 4, 1955, the three squadrons being equipped end of May 1956.

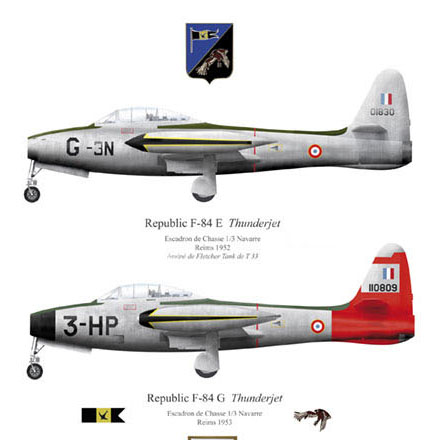
F-84G du 1/3 Navarre

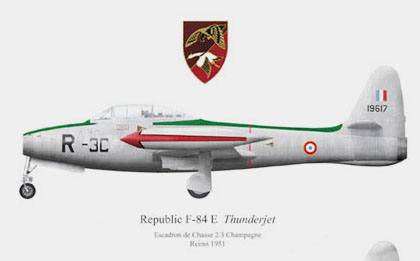
F-84E du 2/3 Champagne

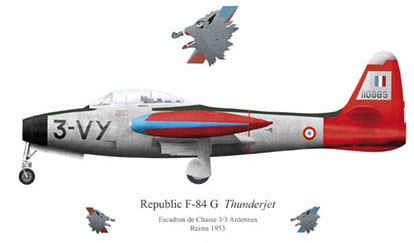
F-84G du 3/3 Ardennes

=== Suez ===
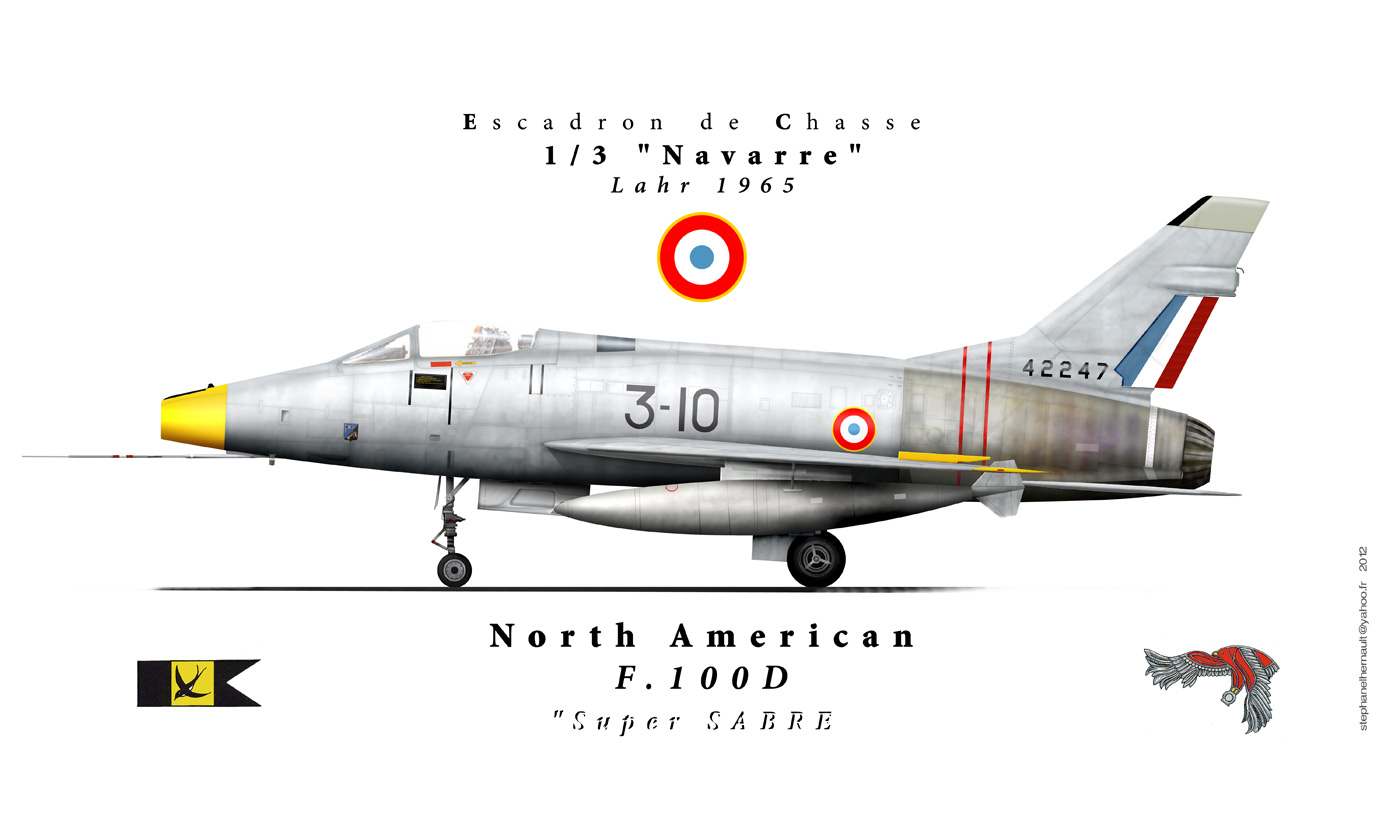
F-100D of the 1/3 Navarre at Lahr in 1965.

The 3^{e} Escadre played an important role during the Suez Crisis. Towards the end of the month of September 1956, some F-84F of the "3" were deployed on the British Air Base RAF Akrotiri on Cyprus.

The hunters (French: chasseurs) of the 3^{e} Escadre participated, along with the F-84F of the 1^{re} Escadre and the Allies of the Royal Air Force to operations on top of Egypt, while targeting Aerial Bases.

The 2/3 Champagne rejoined the base of Nancy in November 1956, followed by the 1/3 in December 1956 and the 3/3 Ardennes in March 1957.

=== Algerian War ===
During the Algerian War, the « 3 » patronized two escadrilles. In March 1956 until June 1957, pilots flew on SIPA S.111 and EALA 1/71. Passing on the T-6, the Escadrille became the EALA 19/72, sponsored by the « 3 » until the relieve of the 13^{e} Escadre in June 1958.

The EALA 4/72 was sponsored and partnered with the 9^{e} Escadre from July 1956 until September 1958.

The two escadrilles conducted their ground support missions from the bases Tébessa and Aerial Base 211 Telergma, with detachments from Steif, Tiaret, Aflou and Bir El Alter notably.

=== NATO/OTAN ===
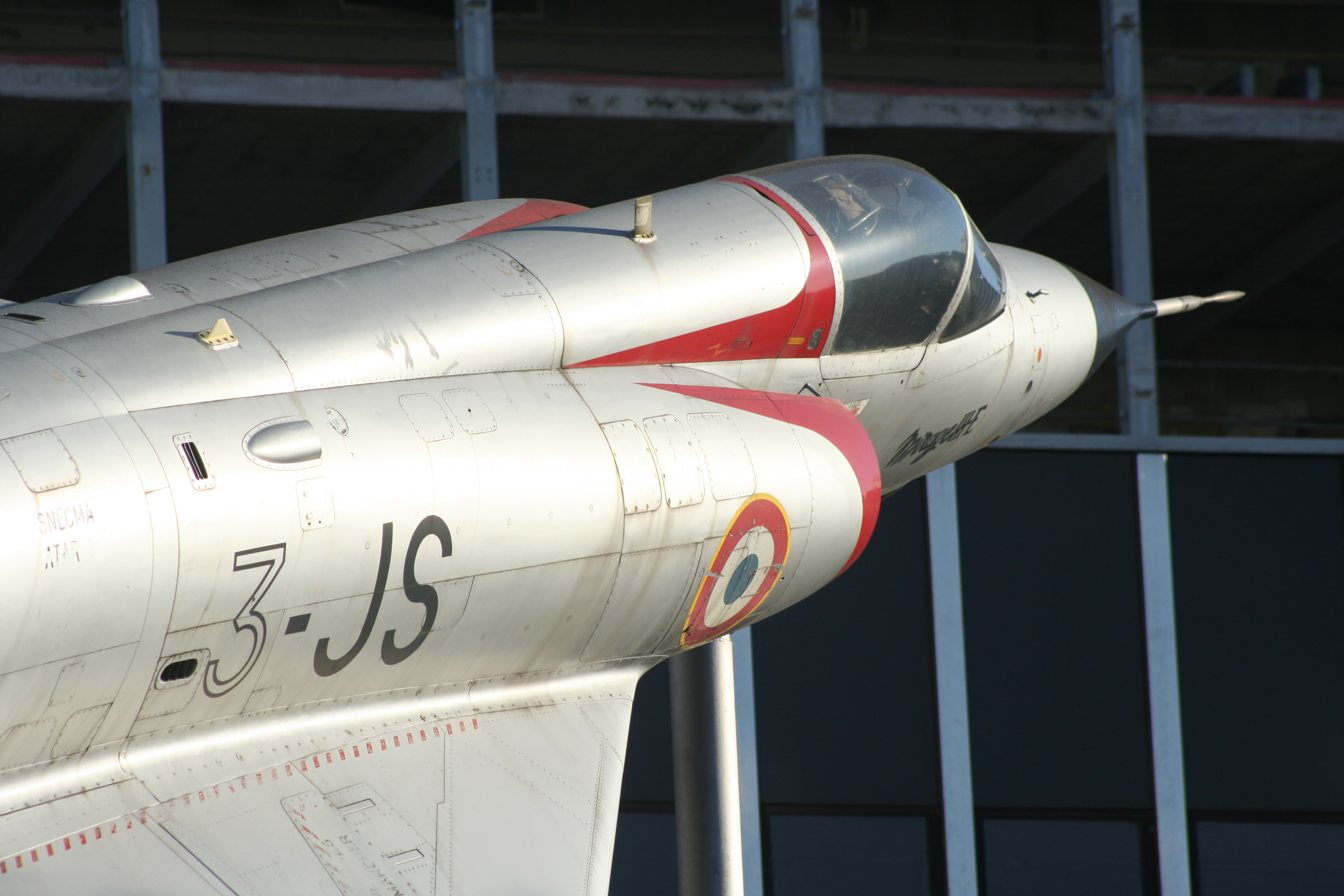
Mirage IIIE 539 with colors of 3-JS of EC 2/3 Champagne in front of the general staff headquarters of the French Air Force at Paris Balard.

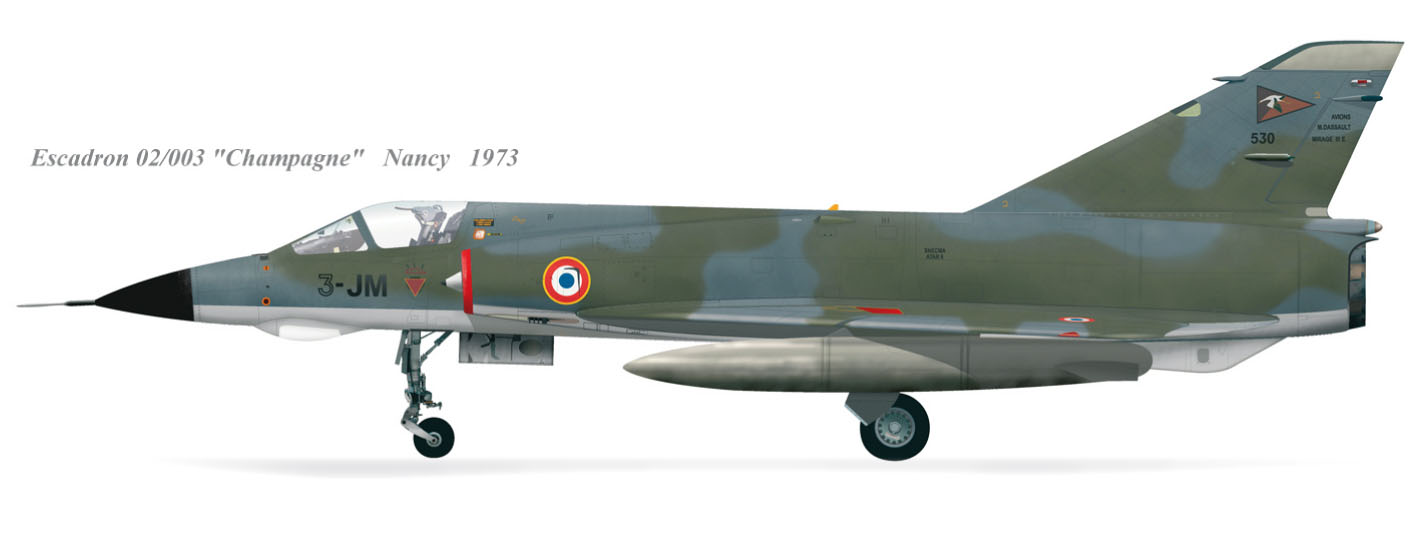
Mirage IIIE of the 2/3 Champagne.

Following the dissolution of the EC 3/3 Ardennes on November 15, 1957, the Escadre of these two squadrons commenced their transition on the F-100 Super Sabre. The first Super Saber landed on a base at Reims beginning of 1959. The Escadre was attached to 4th Allied Tactical Air Force of the NATO.

The 3^{e} EC left Reims in June 1961 and replaced the 13^{e} Escadre which just left Aerial Base 139 Lahr in West Germany. The latter filled the role of nuclear attack tactical missions.

As of October 1965, Champagne started the transition on Dassault Mirage IIIE followed by Navarre end of November 1965. While passing on Mirage IIIE, the squadron changed missions and dedicated itself to aerial defense and tactical assaults. Pilots ensured an alert of five minutes.

=== Nancy ===
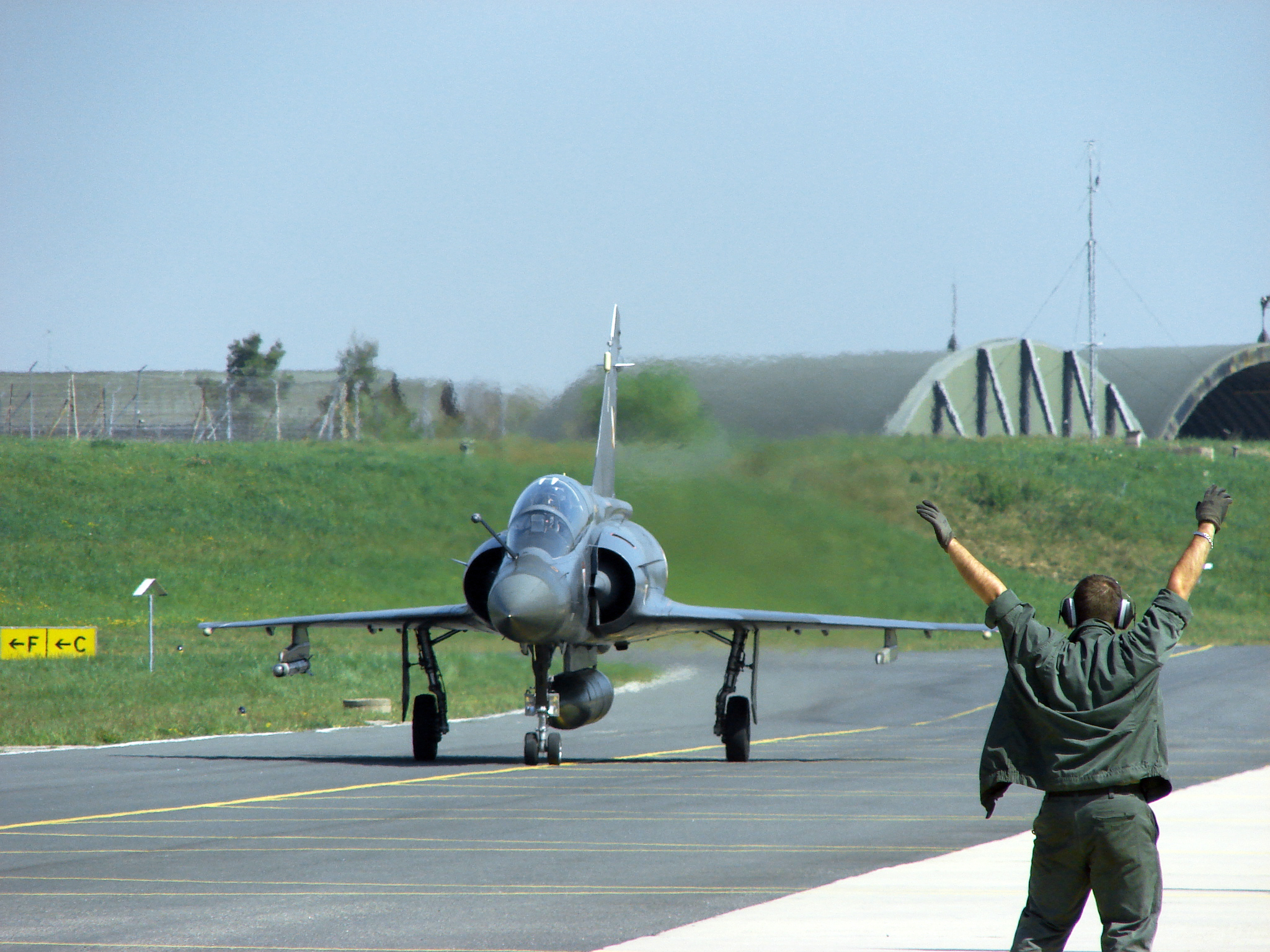
Mirage 2000D on a base.

The Escadre left Germany in August 1967 to garrison at the actual base of Nancy-Ochey. Simultaneously, the latter abandoned the mission of tactical support to assume that of low altitude cover of bases of the Strategic Air Forces.

In 1969, the Mirage IIIE of the « 3 » specialized in assaults with the AS-30 having the aerial defense as a secondary mission.

In 1970, the Escadre was equipped with the AS-37 Martel anti-radar missile. On July 1, 1974, the Escadron de Chasse 3/3 Ardennes was activated on Mirage 5F. The latter abandoned the hunter (French: chasseurs) delta of Dassault in April 1977, and flew accordingly on the Jaguar. The latter changed aircraft again to pass on the Mirage IIIE on June 1, 1987.

The 3^{e} Escadre changed époque on July 31, 1991, when the 2/3 Champagne started to transition of the Mirage 2000N. The 3/3 conducted the last flight on Mirage IIIE of the French Air Force on March 12, 1993. The three squadrons of the « 3 » evolved towards their actual aircraft, the Mirage 2000D.

Towards the end (provisionary) of the new Escadre of the French Air Force, the 3^{e} Escadre was dissolved on June 23, 1995.

The new Escadre returned in the organization of the French Air Force in 2014. The 3^{e} Escadre de Chasse was one of the first units recreated, on September 5, 2014.

=== Exterior Operations ===
In 2015, three Mirage 2000D of the Escadre participated to Opération Chammal.

== Escadrons/Squadrons in 2015 ==
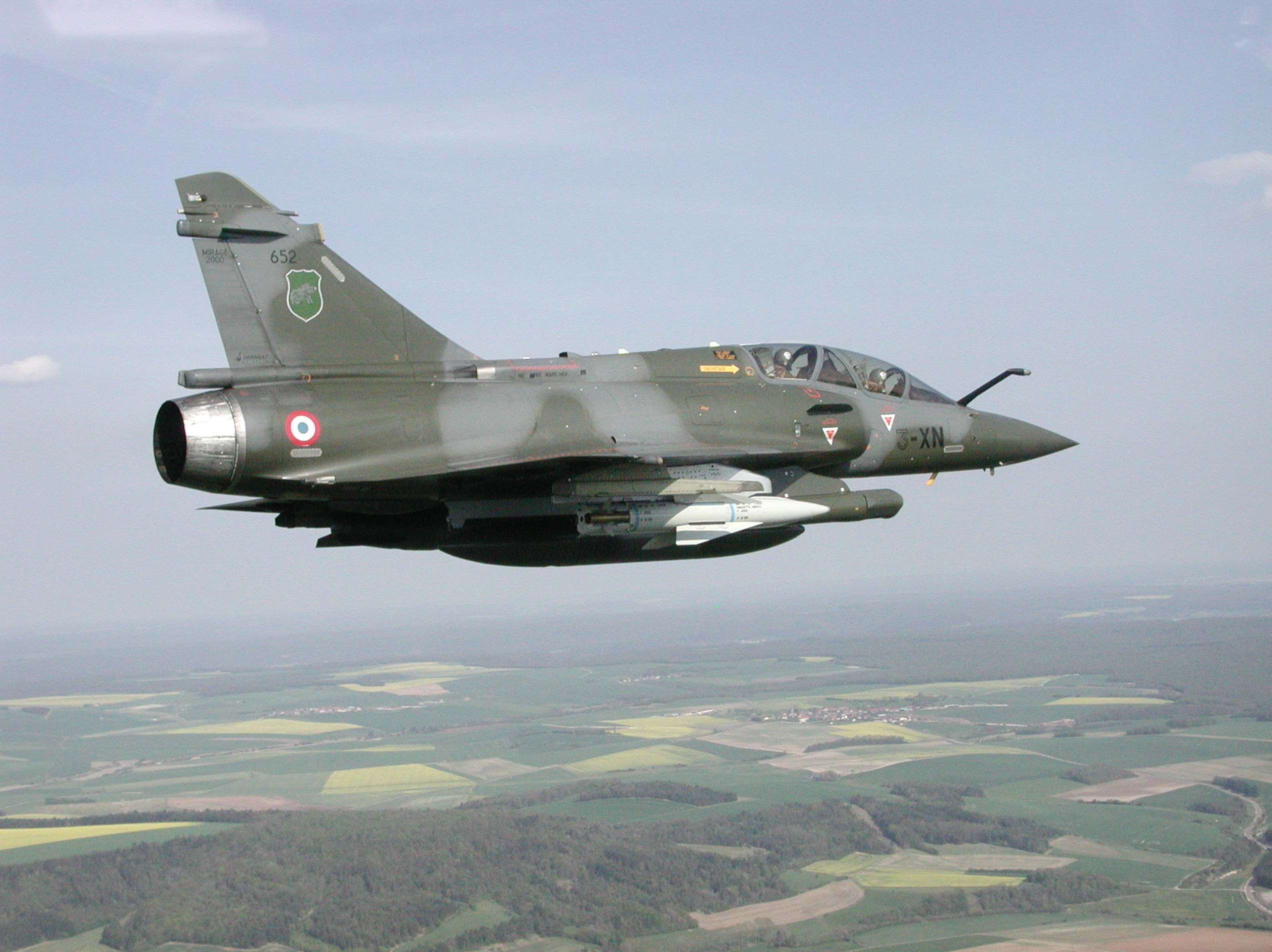
Mirage 2000D of the 3/3 Ardennes.

Since formation on September 5, 2014, the 3^{e} Escadre de Chasse is formed of four squadrons:

- Escadron de Chasse 1/3 Navarre (EC 1/3 Navarre)
- Escadron de Chasse 2/3 Champagne (EC 2/3 Champagne)
- Escadron de Chasse 3/3 Ardennes (EC 3/3 Ardennes)
- Escadron de transformation Mirage 2000D 4/3 Argonne

== Escadrons/Squadrons history ==
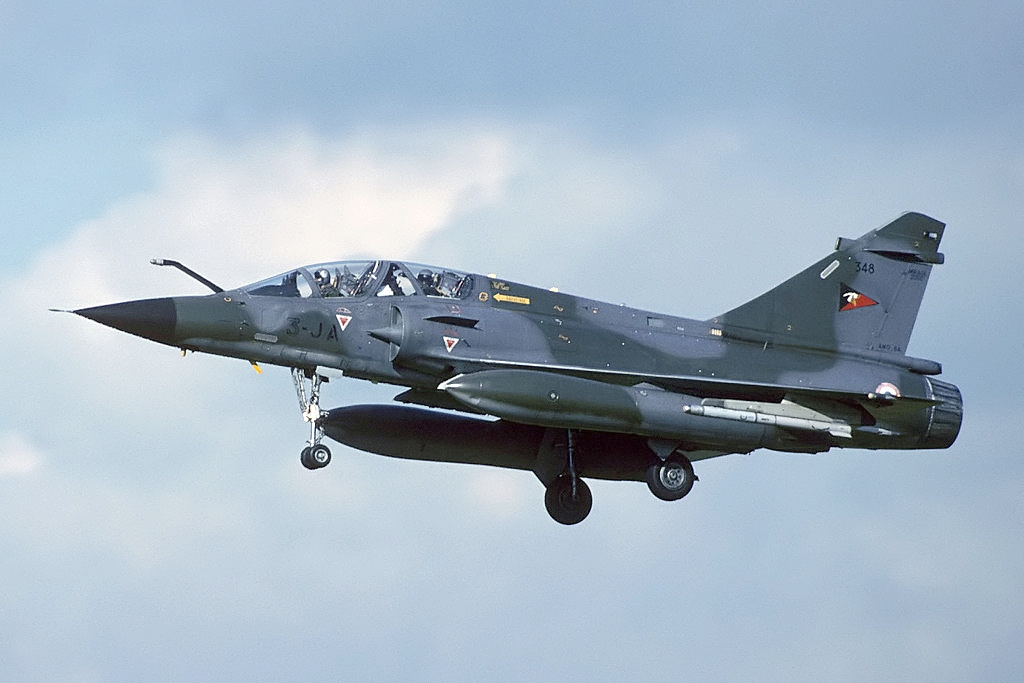
Mirage 2000N of the 2/3 Champagne in 1994.

=== Navarre ===
- GC I/4 Navarre (01/01/1944 to 01/05/1944 and 07/12/1944 to 01/07/1947)
- GC I/3 Navarre (01/07/1947 to 01/11/1950)
- EC 1/3 Navarre (01/11/1950 to 23/06/1995 and since 05/09/2014)

=== Champagne ===
- GC I/5 Champagne (01/01/1944 to 01/07/1947)
- GC II/3 Champagne (01/07/1947 to 01/11/1950)
- EC 2/3 Champagne (01/11/1950 to 23/06/1995 and since 05/09/2014)

=== Ardennes ===
- GC III/3 Ardennes (17/07/1944 to 31/10/1944)
- EC 3/3 Ardennes (01/01/1953 to 15/11/1957 and 01/07/1974 to 23/06/1995 and since 05/09/2014)

=== Roussillon ===
- GC III/6 Roussillon (01/01/1944 to 01/03/1945)

=== EALA ===
During the Algerian War, the 3^{e} Escadre de Chasse sponsored two escadrilles of support light aviation (EALA):

- EALA 1/71 (01/04/1956 to 30/06/1957) renamed EALA 19/72 (01/07/1957 to 06/1958, date to which the patronization was retook by the 13^{e} Escadres
- EALA 4/72 (01/07/1956 to 01/08/1961)

== Bases ==
- Trêves on Septembre 1945
- Aerial Base 136 Friedrichshafen in May 1947
- Aerial Base 112 Reims-Champagne (1950-1959)
- Aerial Base 139 Lahr (1959-1967)
- Aerial Base 133 Nancy-Ochey (since 1967)

== Equipment ==
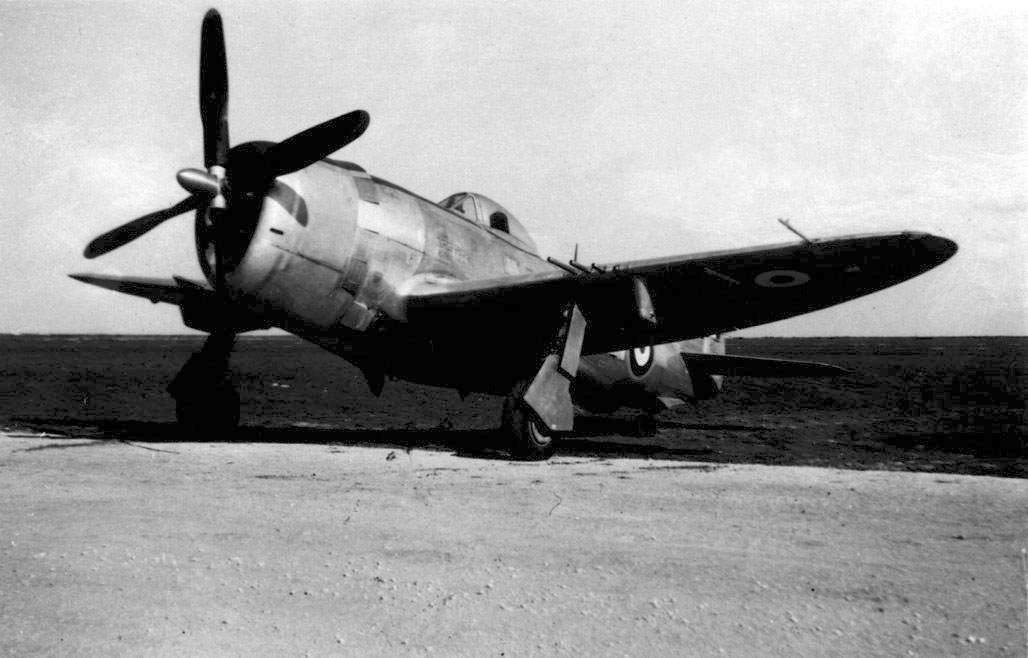
P-47D of the 3/3 Ardennes.

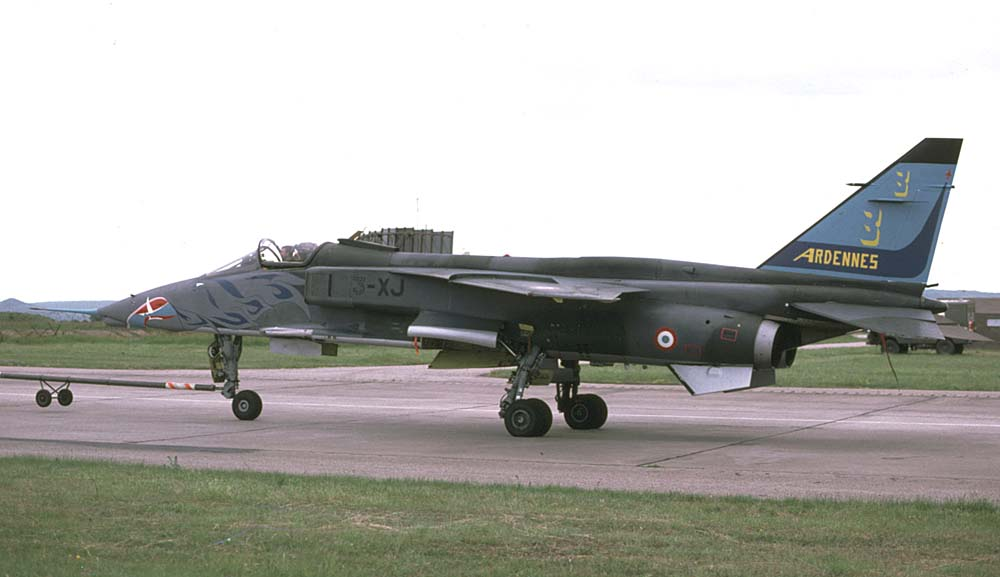
Jaguar of the 3/3 Ardennes, one the three squadrons of the 3^{e}EC.

- Bell P-39N/Q Airacobra (01/01/1944 to Octobre 1944)
- Republic P-47 Thunderbolt (12/10/1944 to July 1948)
- Supermarine Spitfire Mk.IX (June 1948 to April 1950)
- De Havilland Vampire (October 1950 to March 29, 1951)
- Republic F-84E/G Thunderjet (May 17, 1951 to 1956)
- Republic F-84F Thunderstreak (04/11/1955 to 1959)
- SIPA S.111 (01/04/1956 to 30/06/1957)
- T-6G (01/07/1956 to 01/08/1961)
- F-100D (January 1959 to January 1966)
- Dassault Mirage IIIE (29/07/1965 to 11/05/1994)
- Dassault Mirage 5F (01/01/1974 to May 1977)
- SEPECAT Jaguar (April 1977 to June 1, 1987)
- Dassault Mirage 2000N (30/08/1994 to August 1998)
- Dassault Mirage 2000D (since 29/03/1994)

== See also ==
- Major (France)
- Chief of Staff of the French Air Force
- List of Escadres of the French Air Force
