= Escadron de Transformation Mirage 2000D 4/3 Argonne =

Transformation Squadron Mirage 2000D 4/3 Argonne
- Escadron de Transformation Mirage 2000D 4/3 Argonne
- Active: 1953 - 2021
- Country: France
- Branch: Armée de l'air et de l'espace
- Type: Trainer aircraft
- Role: Aircrew conversion
- Garrison/HQ: BA 133 Nancy – Ochey Air Base

Aircraft flown
- Trainer: Dassault Mirage 2000D

Escadron de Transformation Mirage 4/3 Argonne was a French Air and Space Force (Armée de l'air et de l'espace) Squadron located at BA 133 Nancy – Ochey Air Base, Meurthe-et-Moselle, France which operates the Dassault Mirage 2000D. It was dissolved in 2021.

== Escadrilles ==
From 1953 to 2001 :

- 1st Escadrille : SPA 31 "Archer Romain" (Roman Archer)
- 2nd Escadrille : SPA 48 "Tête de Coq" avec devise "Chante et Combat" (Rooster's head with motto "Sing and Fight")
- 3rd Escadrille : SPA 154 "Grue" (Crane) / From 1995 to 2001

From 2010 to 2021 :

- 1st Escadrille : SPA 31 "Archer Romain"
- 2nd Escadrille : SPA 48 "Tête de Coq" avec devise "Chante et Combat"

== Escadres ==
- 1e Escadre de Chasse (1953 - 1966)
- 7e Escadre de Chasse (1974 - 1995)
- 3e Escadre de Chasse (2014 - 2021)

== Denominations ==
- Escadron de Chasse (EC) 3/1 Argonne (1953 - 1966)
- Escadron de Chasse 2/7 Argonne (1974 - 2001)
- Escadron de Transformation Mirage 2000D (ETD) 2/7 Argonne (2010 - 2016)
- Escadron de Transformation Mirage 2000D 4/3 Argonne (2016 - 2021)

== Airbases ==
- Base Aérienne 113 Saint-Dizier-Robinson (1953 - 1947) / (1974 - 2001)
- Base Aérienne 133 Nancy-Ochey (2010 - 2021)

== Aircraft flown ==
- Republic F-84G Thunderjet (1953 - 1956)
- Republic F-84F Thunderstreak (1956 - 1957)
- SEPECAT Jaguar A/E (1974 - 2005)
- Dassault/ Dornier Alpha Jet E (1995 - 2005)
- Dassault Mirage 2000D (2010 - 2021)

== See also ==
- List of French Air and Space Force aircraft squadrons
