= French Air and Space Force =

Air and space warfare branch of France's armed forces

Air and Space Force
- Armée de l'air et de l'espace
- Founded: 2 July 1934 (92 years, 143 days ago)
- Country: France
- Type: Air and space force
- Role: Aerial and space warfare
- Size: 38,882 active duty personnel (2023) 5,239 civilians (2023); 520 aircraft; 41 satellites
- Part of: French Armed Forces
- Garrison/HQ: Hexagone Balard, Paris
- Colours: Blue, white, red
- Anniversaries: 2 July
- Engagements: World War I; World War II; Indochina War; Algerian War; Chadian–Libyan conflict; Gulf War; Operation Provide Comfort; Operation Southern Watch; January 1993 airstrikes on Iraq; Operation Deny Flight; Operation Deliberate Force; Kosovo War; War in Afghanistan; Opération Harmattan; Military intervention against ISIL; Operation Serval; Operation Barkhane
- Website: defense.gouv.fr/air

Commanders
- Chief of the Armed Forces: President Emmanuel Macron
- Chief of Staff of the French Air and Space Force: Général d'armée aérienne Jérôme Bellanger

Insignia
- Roundel

- Fin flash

Aircraft flown
- Electronic warfare: E-3 Sentry
- Fighter: Rafale, Mirage 2000
- Helicopter: AS532 Cougar, Fennec, EC725 Caracal
- Trainer: Alpha Jet, PC-21, SOCATA TBM, Extra EA-300, EMB 121 Xingu
- Transport: Lockheed C-130, Airbus A310, Airbus A330, Airbus A400M, Dassault Falcon 7X, Dassault Falcon 900, Dassault Falcon 2000, Socata TBM-700
- Tanker: Airbus A330 MRTT, Airbus A400M

The French Air and Space Force (FASF, French: Armée de l'air et de l'espace, pronounced [aʁme d(ə) lɛʁ e d(ə) lɛspas], lit. 'Army of Air and Space', AAE) is the air and space force of the French Armed Forces. Formed in 1909 as the Service Aéronautique ("Aeronautical Service"), a service arm of the French Army, it became an independent military branch in 1934 as the French Air Force (Armée de l'air). On 11 September 2020, it assumed its current name, the French Air and Space Force, to reflect an "evolution of its mission" into the area of outer space.

The number of aircraft in service with the French Air and Space Force varies depending on the source; the Ministry of Armed Forces gives a figure of 658 aircraft in 2014. According to 2025 data, this figure includes 207 combat aircraft: 99 Dassault Mirage 2000 and 108 Dassault Rafale. As of 2021, the French Air and Space Force employs a total of 40,500 regular personnel, with a reserve element of 5,187 in 2014.

The Chief of Staff of the French Air and Space Force (CEMAAE) is a direct subordinate of the Chief of the Defence Staff (CEMA), a high-ranking military officer who in turn answers to the civilian Minister of the Armed Forces.

== History ==
=== In the beginning ===
==== Establishment of the Service Aéronautique ====
The founding of the Service Aéronautique began in 1909, when the French War Minister approved the purchase of a Wright Biplane. The following year, another Wright biplane, a Bleriot, and two Farmans were added to the lone acquisition. On 22 October 1910, General Pierre Roques was appointed Inspector General of what was becoming referred to as the Cinquieme Arme, or Fifth Service.

In March 1912, the French parliament enacted legislation to establish the air arm. It was projected to consist of three distinct branches based on aircraft missions—reconnaissance, bombing, or countering other aircraft.

==== Inventing the fighter plane ====
France was one of the first states to start building aircraft. At the beginning of World War I, France had a total of 148 planes (eight from French Naval Aviation (Aéronautique Navale)) and 15 airships. In August 1914, as France entered World War I, French airpower consisted of 24 squadrons (escadrilles) supporting ground forces, including three squadrons assigned to cavalry units. By 8 October, expansion to 65 squadrons was being planned. By December, the plans called for 70 new squadrons.

Meanwhile, even as procurement efforts scaled up, inventive airmen were trying to use various light weapons against opposing airplanes. Roland Garros invented a crude method of firing a machine gun through the propeller arc by cladding his propeller with metal wedges deflecting any errant bullets. After destroying three German airplanes, Garros came down behind enemy lines on 18 April 1915. His secret weapon was thus exposed, and Anthony Fokker came up with the synchronization gear that by July 1, 1915, turned airplanes into flying gun platforms.

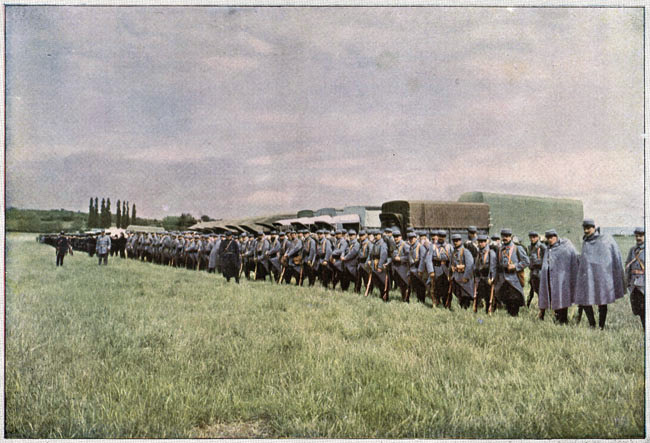
"Company of aviators", September 1914, by Jules Gervais-Courtellemont

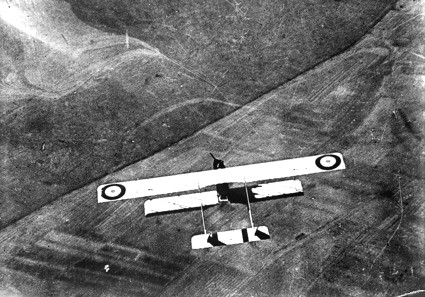
French aircraft during World War I, flying over German held territory (1915)

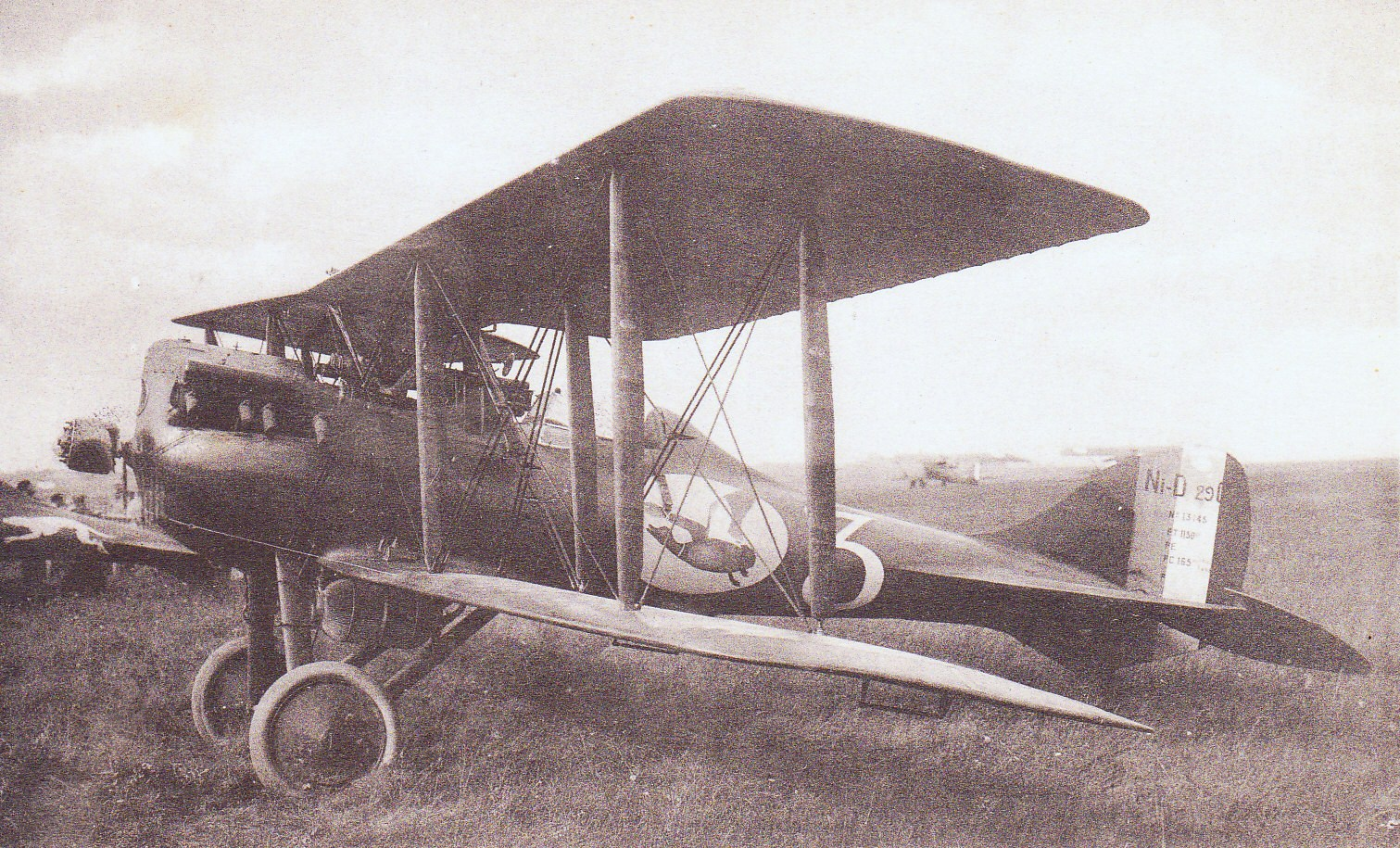
Nieuport-Delage NiD.29 C.1 fighter used in the early post-WWI period.

==== Founding fighter formations ====
On 21 February 1916, the Verdun Offensive began. New weapons demanded new tactics. Commandant Charles de Tricornet de Rose was the original French pilot, having learned to fly in March 1911. This experienced flier was given a free hand to select pilots and airplanes for a new unit tasked with keeping German observation craft from over the French lines. The ad hoc unit commandeered all available Morane-Saulniers and Nieuport 11s, as well as the 15 best pilots regardless of posting. This ad hoc unit patrolling the skies over Verdun was the first French Groupement de Chasse. The Groupement was successful despite Tricornet's death in a mishap. Under the leadership of new commander Captain Auguste de Reverand, such flying aces as Georges Guynemer, Charles Nungesser, and Albert Deullin began their careers.

Encouraged by the success of their original Groupement, the French massed several squadrons for the Battle of the Somme. The burgeoning French aircraft inventory afforded the formation of Groupement de Combat de la Somme under Captain Felix Brocard. The Groupement was formed on 1 July 1916 with a posting of four Nieuport squadrons: Squadron N.3, N.26, N.73, and N.103. Three other squadrons--Squadron N.37, N.62, and N.65 were temporarily attached at various times.

On 19 October 1916, three fixed Groupes de Combat were established, each to consist of four squadron. Numbered 11, 12, and 13, they were only the first three Groupements.

==== Concentrating airpower ====
During March 1917, Groupe de Combat 14 and Groupe de Combat 15 were formed. Again, each new Groupe was assigned four Nieuport fighter squadrons; again, each was sent to support a different French field army.

On 10 January 1918, Groupe de Combat 16 was formed from four SPAD squadrons. In February, five more Groupe de Combats were founded from SPAD squadrons: Groupes de Combats number 17, 18, 19, 20, and 21. The various Nieuport models were now being phased out as the new SPADs filled the inventories of the French.

With the Groupes success, the French were encouraged to amass airpower into still larger tactical units. On 4 February 1918, Escadre de Combat No. 1 was created out of Groupe de Combat 15, Groupe de Combat 18, and Groupe de Combat 19. It was followed by Escadre de Combat No. 2, formed on the 27th from Groupe de Combat 11, Groupe de Combat 13, and Groupe de Combat 17. Each groupe would be stocked with 72 fighters.

The escadres were not the end of the French accumulation of air power. On 14 May 1918, they were grouped into the Division Aerienne. As bombing aircraft were also being concentrated into larger units, the new division would also contain Escadre de Bombardement No. 12 and Escadre de Bombardement No. 13. The bombing units were both equipped with 45 Breguet 14 bombers. The last addition to the new division was five protection squadrons, operating 75 Caudron R.11 gunships to fly escort for the Breguets.

On 25 June 1918, Groupe de Combat 22 was founded. Groupe de Combat 23 followed soon thereafter. A couple of night bombardment groupes were also founded.

==== Committing the Division Aerienne ====
Then, on 15 July 1918, the Division was committed to the Second Battle of the Marne. From then on, whether in whole or in part, the Division Aerienne fought until war's end. By the time of the Battle of Saint-Mihiel, the French could commit 27 fighter squadrons to the effort, along with reconnaissance and bombing squadrons. The 1,137 airplanes dedicated to the battle were the most numerous used in a World War I battle.

When the 11 November 1918 armistice came, French air power had expanded to 336 squadrons, 74 of which were SPAD fighter squadrons. France had 3,608 planes in service. Confirmed claims of 2,049 destroyed enemy airplanes included 307 that had been brought down within French lines. French airmen had also destroyed 357 observation balloons. However, 5,500 pilots and observers were killed out of the 17,300 engaged in the conflict, amounting to 31%. A 1919 newspaper article reported that the French Air Force had suffered losses of 61%.

=== Interwar period ===
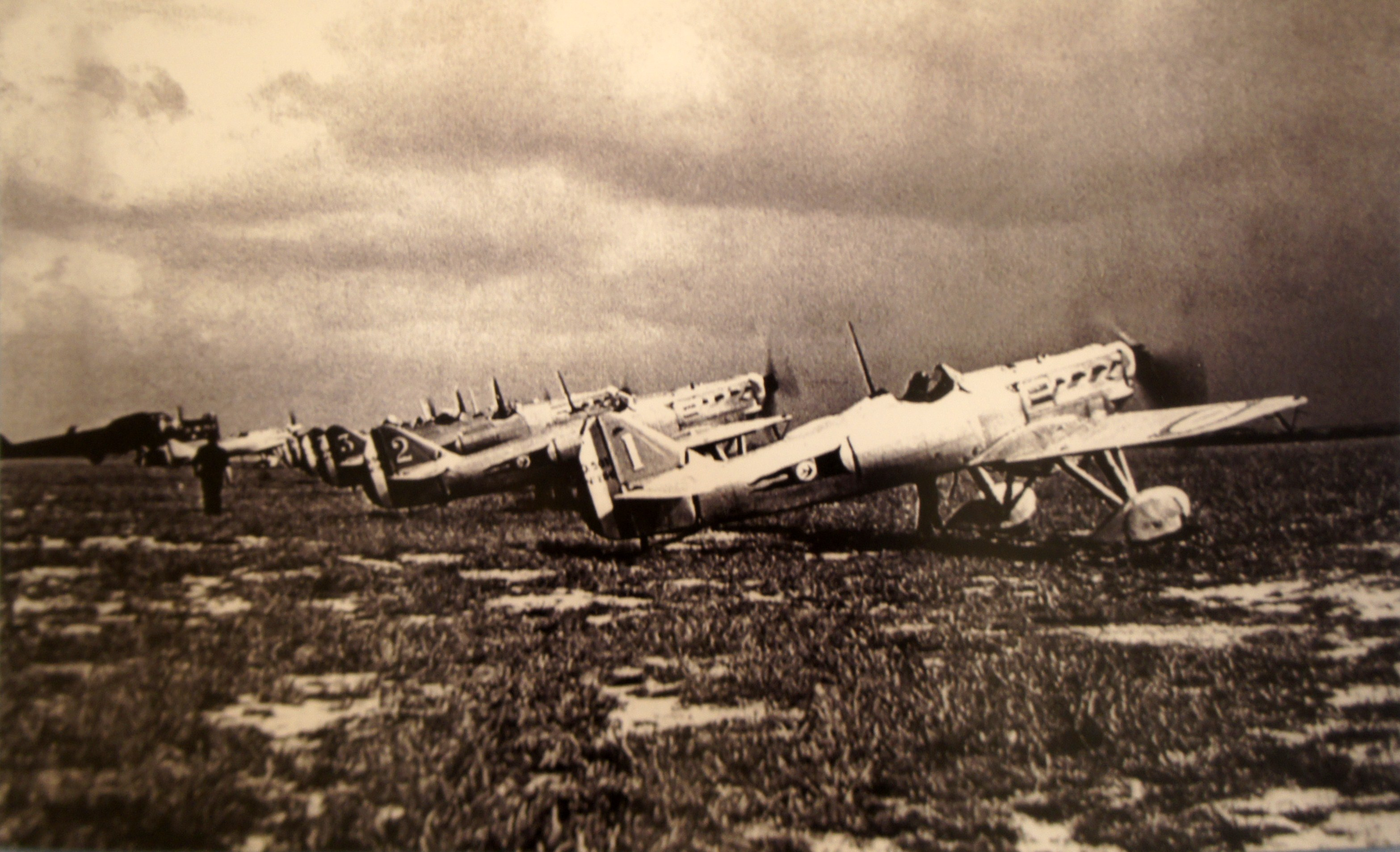
Dewoitine D.510 monoplane fighters from the mid-1930s

Military aeronautics was established as a "special arm" by the law of 8 December 1922. It remained under the auspices of the French Army. It was not until 2 July 1934, that the "special arm" became an independent service and was totally independent.

The initial air arm was the cradle of French military parachuting, responsible for the first formation of the Air Infantry Groups (Groupements de l'Infanterie de l'Air) in the 1930s, out of which the Air Parachute Commandos (commandos parachutistes de l'air) descended.

The French Air Force maintained a continuous presence across the French colonial empire, particularly from the 1920s to 1943.

=== Second World War ===
The French Air Force played an important role in the war, most notably during the Battle of France in 1940. The Vichy French Air Force had later a significant presence in the French Levant.

The engagement of the Free French Air Forces from 1940 to 1943, and then the engagement of the aviators of the French Liberation Army, were also important episodes in the history of the French Air Force. The sacrifices of Commandant René Mouchotte and Lieutenant Marcel Beau illustrated their devotion.

=== 1945–present ===
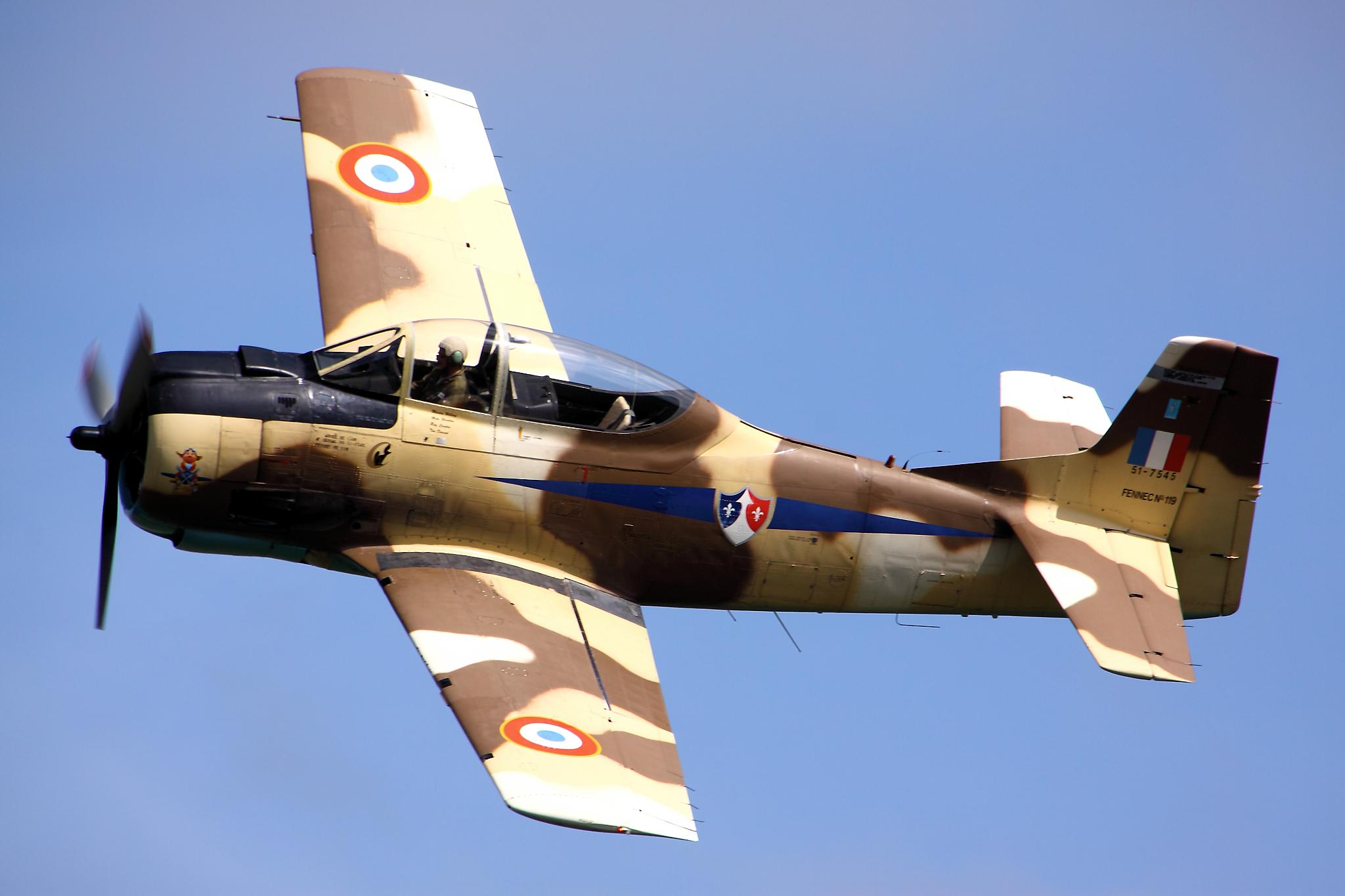
A North American T-28 Trojan, used against guerrillas during the Algerian War

After 1945, France rebuilt its aircraft industry. The French Air Force participated in several colonial wars during the Empire such as French Indochina after the Second World War. Since 1945, the French Air Force was notably engaged in Indochina (1945–1954).

The French Air Force was active in the Algerian War from 1952 until 1962 and Suez (1956), later Mauritania and Chad, the Persian Gulf (1990–1991), ex-Yugoslavia and more recently in Afghanistan, Mali and Iraq.

From 1964 until 1971 the French Air Force had the unique responsibility for the French nuclear arm via Dassault Mirage IV or ballistic missiles of Air Base 200 Apt-Saint-Christol on the Plateau d'Albion.

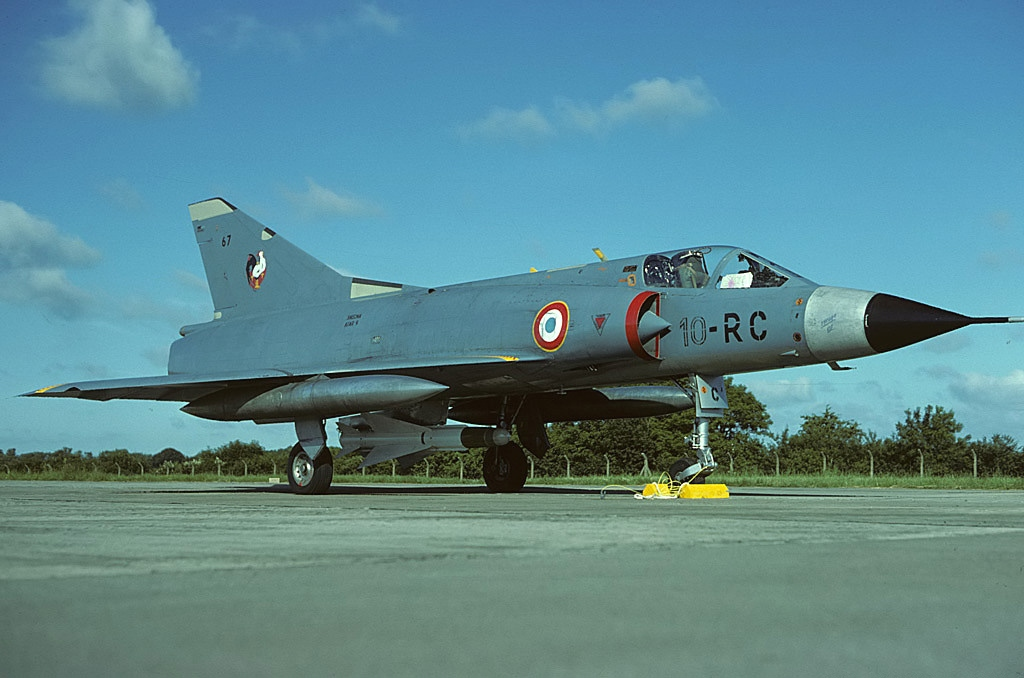
Mirage IIIC of EC 2/10 "Seine" pictured in 1980 armed with a Matra R.530

Accordingly, from 1962, the French political leadership shifted its military emphasis to nuclear deterrence, implementing a complete reorganisation of the Air Force, with the creation of four air regions and seven major specialised commands, among which were the Strategic Air Forces Command, COTAM, the Air Command of Aerial Defense Forces (Commandement Air des Forces de Défense Aérienne, CAFDA), and the Force aérienne tactique (FATac). In 1964, the Second Tactical Air Command was created in Nancy to take command of air units stationed in France but not assigned to NATO. The Military Air Transport Command had previously been formed in February 1962 from the Groupement d'Unités Aériennes Spécialisées. Also created in 1964 was the Escadron des Fusiliers Commandos de l'Air (EFCA), seemingly grouping all FCA units. The Dassault Mirage IV, the principal French strategic bomber, was designed to strike Soviet positions as part of the French nuclear triad.

In 1985, the Air Force had four major flying commands, the Strategic Air Forces Command, the Tactical Air Forces Command, the Military Air Transport Command, and CAFDA (air defence).

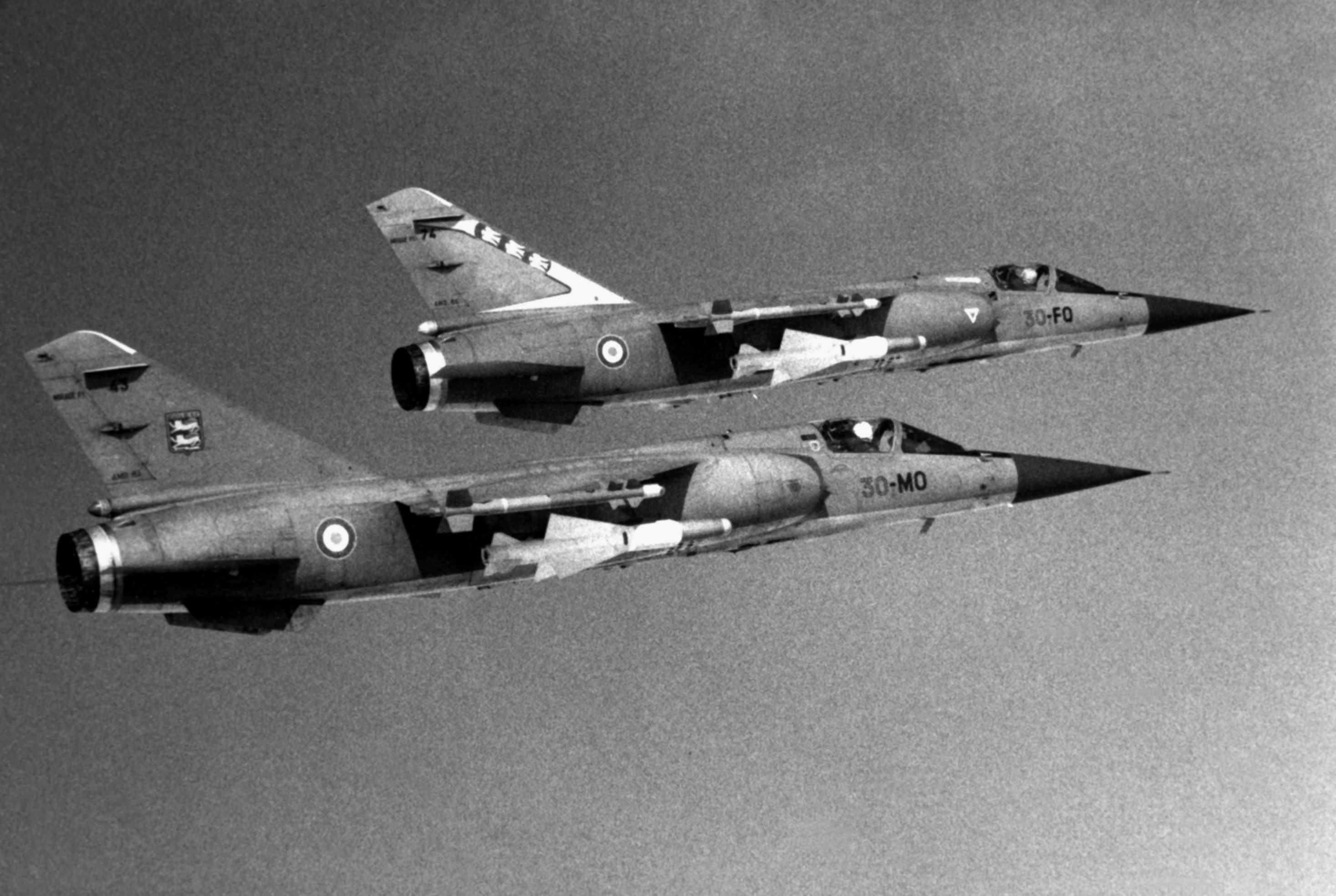
A 1986 view of a Mirage F1 from the Escadron de Chasse 2/30 Normandie-Niemen and another from the Escadron de Chasse 3/30 Lorraine, both armed with Matra R.530 missiles. Squadron insignias are visible on the two aircraft.

CFAS had two squadrons of S2 and S-3 IRBMs at the Plateau d'Albion, six squadrons of Mirage IVAs (at Mont de Marsan, Cazaux, Orange, Istres, St Dizier, and EB 3/94 at Luxeuil – Saint-Sauveur Air Base), and three squadrons of C-135F, as well as a training/reconnaissance unit, CIFAS 328, at Bordeaux. The Force aérienne tactique included the 3e Escadre de Chasse, 4e Escadre de Chasse, 7e Escadre de Chasse, and the EC 11, EC 13, and ER 33 wings, with a total of 19 squadrons of Mirage III, SEPECAT Jaguars, two squadrons flying the Mirage 5F (EC 2/13 and EC 3/13, both at Colmar), and a squadron flying the Mirage F.1CR. CoTAM counted 28 squadrons, of which ten were fixed-wing transport squadrons, and the remainder helicopter and liaison squadrons, at least five of which were overseas. CAFDA numbered 14 squadrons mostly flying the Dassault Mirage F.1C. Two other commands had flying units, the Air Force Training Command, and the Air Force Transmissions Command, with four squadrons and three trials units.

Dassault Aviation led the way mainly with delta-wing designs, which formed the basis for the Dassault Mirage III series of fighter jets. The Mirage demonstrated its abilities in the Six-Day War, Yom Kippur War, Falklands War, and Gulf War, becoming one of the most popular jet fighters of its day and being widely sold.

In 1994, the Fusiliers Commandos de l'Air command was reestablished under a different form.

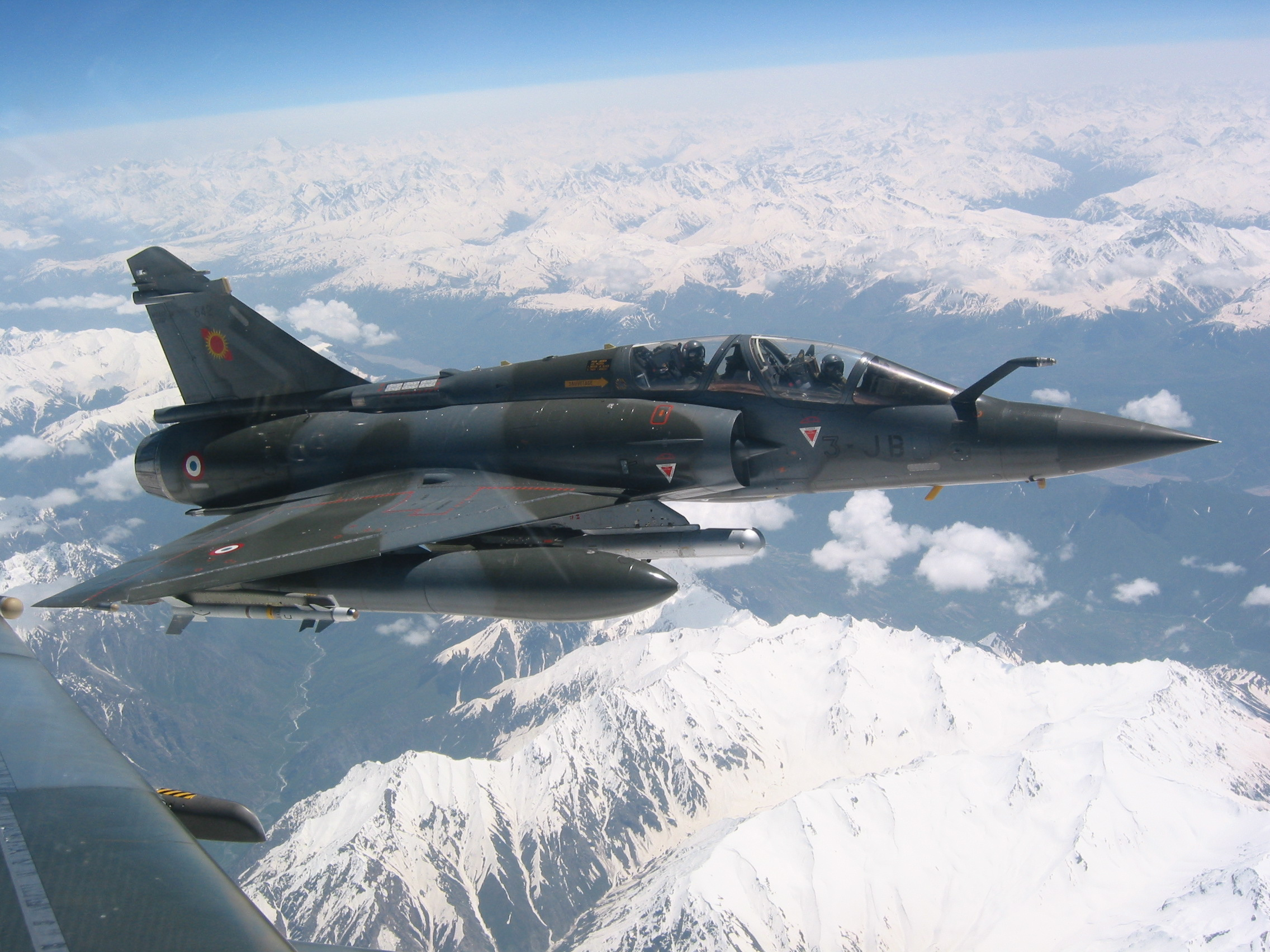
Mirage 2000D in flight

The French Air Force entered a phase of inventory replacement and expansion. The Air Force ordered the Airbus A400M military transport aircraft, then in development. By November 2016, 11 had already been delivered to ET00.061 at Orleans-Bricy, and integration of the new Dassault Rafale multi-role jet fighter was underway; the first 20-aircraft squadron became operational in 2006 at Saint-Dizier.

In 2009, France rejoined the NATO Military Command Structure, having been absent since 1966. France was a leading nation, alongside the United States, United Kingdom and Italy in implementing the UN sponsored no-fly zone in Libya (NATO Operation Unified Protector), deploying 20 fighter aircraft to Benghazi in defense of rebel-held positions and the civilian population.

The last remaining squadron of Dassault Mirage F1s were retired in July 2014 and replaced with Dassault Rafales.

Logo between 1989 and 2010

Logo between 2010 and 2020

On 13 July 2019, President Emmanuel Macron announced the creation of a space command, which would come into being within the French Air Force by September 2019, and the transformation of the French Air Force into the French Air and Space Force. According to Defense Minister Florence Parly, France reserves the right to arm French satellites with lasers for defensive purposes.

The official renaming occurred on 24 July 2020, with the new Air and Space Force logo unveiled on 11 September 2020.

On 26 July 2023, FASF conducted its first ever joint fighter exercise with Japan, continuing its defense ties between the two countries.

== Organisation ==
The Chief of Staff of the French Air and Space Force (CEMAAE) determines French Air and Space Force doctrines application and advises the Chief of the Defence Staff (CEMA) on the deployment, manner, and use of the Air and Space Force. They are responsible for the preparation and logistic support of the French Air and Space Force. The CEMAA is assisted by a Deputy Chief, the Major Général de l'Armée de l'Air, who is the Chief of Staff of the Air and Space Forces Staff. Finally, the CEMAA is assisted by the Inspectorate of the French Air and Space Force (IAA) and by the French Air and Space Force Health Service Inspection (ISSAA).

The Air and Space Force is organized in accordance with Chapter 4, Title II, Book II of the Third Part of the French Defense Code (French: code de la Défense), which replaced decree n° 91-672 dated 14 July 1991.

Under the authority of the Chief of Staff of the French Air and Space Force (CEMAAE) in Paris, the Air and Space Force includes:

- Chief of Staff of the French Air and Space Force, heading the État-major de l'Armee de l'air et de l'espace (EMAAE)
- Forces
- Air Bases
- Directorate of Human Resources of the French Air and Space Force
- Services

The Air and Space Force headquarters, employing 150 personnel, are located alongside the Chief of the Defence Staff's offices (EMA) and the Army and Navy headquarters at the Balard armed forces complex in Paris. The new site replaced the former Paris Air Base (BA 117) which served as air staff headquarters until 25 June 2015.

=== Air and Space Army Staff ===
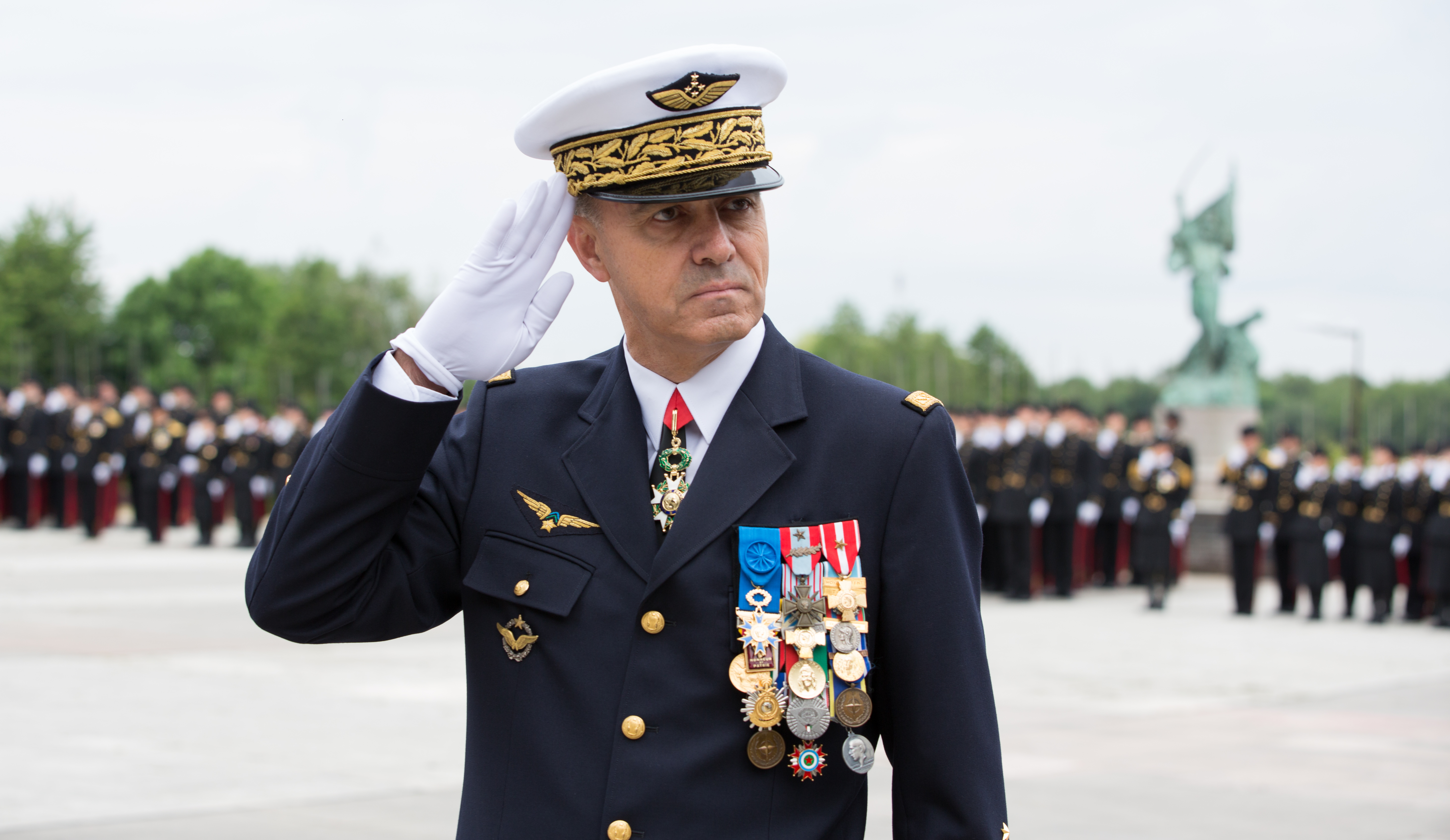
Général d'armée aérienne André Lanata, former chief of staff of the French Air Force

The Air and Space Army Staff (État-major de l'Armée de l'air et de l'espace) is the highest service-specific authority of the French air force. It is formally under the command of the Chief of Staff of the Air and Space Force (CEMAAE), but the organisation is under the direct authority of his deputy, the Major General of the Air and Space Force (major général de l'Armée de l'air et de l'espace (MGAAE), in the French military tradition a 'Major General' is not a military rank, but the designation of Chief of Staff of a high command.)

Organisation:

Chief of Staff of the Air and Space Force (CEMAAE), the chief of the French Air and Space Force, officer in the rank of General of Air Army (a full General equivalent).

- Director of the Aeronautical Industrial Service (Directeur du Service industriel de l’aéronautique (SIAé)) in charge of the overhaul of all aerial vehicles of the French Armed Forces (the Air and Space Force, the naval aviation, the army aviation and the gendarmerie), officer in the rank of a General Engineer for Armament First Class (a Major-General equivalent).
- Commandant of the Air and Space Gendarmerie (Commandant de la gendarmerie de l'air et de l'espace (GAE)), the chief of the French Air and Space Force military police force, officer in the rank of a General of Brigade (a Brigadier General equivalent).

Major General of the Air and Space Force (MGAAE), officer in the rank of General of Air Corps (a Lieutenant-General equivalent)

- Directly subordinate:
  - Forces (formerly part of the Air Forces Command. With its transformation into the Territorial Command of the Air and Space Force they were detached and put under direct subordination of the Chief of Staff):
    - Commandant of the Air Force Brigade of Fighter Aviation (BAAC) (Nancy – Ochey Air Base) (French: Brigade Aérienne de l'Aviation de Chasse (BAAC)), is responsible for all air defense, air-to-ground and reconnaissance aircraft (including Dassault Rafale, Mirage 2000-5F, Mirage 2000B/C/D, Transall C-160 Gabriel). Commanded by an officer in the rank of a General of Air Brigade (a Brigadier General equivalent). With the creation of the BACEA on the basis of the former BACE brigade, its surface-to-air missile units were transferred to the fighter brigade.
      - Fighter units:
        - 2nd Fighter Wing (2e escadre de chasse) (BA 116 Luxeuil-Saint Sauveur Air Base).
          - Fighter Squadron 1/2 Cigognes (Escadron de chasse 1/2 Cigognes, flying Mirage 2000-5F).
        - 3rd Fighter Wing (3e escadre de chasse) (BA 133 Nancy-Ochey Air Base).
          - Fighter Squadron 1/3 Navarre (Escadron de chasse 1/3 Navarre, fighter-bomber squadron flying Mirage 2000D).
          - Fighter Squadron 2/3 Champagne (Escadron de chasse 2/3 Champagne, the French Air and Space Force's Mirage 2000 OCU, flying Mirage 2000D and B).
          - Fighter Squadron 3/3 Ardennes (Escadron de chasse 3/3 Ardennes, fighter-bomber squadron flying Mirage 2000D).
        - 30th Fighter Wing (30e escadre de chasse) (BA 118 Mont-de-Marsan Air Base).
          - Fighter and Experimentation Squadron 1/30 Côte d'Argent (Escadron de chasse et d'expérimentation 1/30 Côte d'Argent, the French Air and Space Force's fighter OEU squadron flying Rafale and Mirage 2000).
          - Fighter Regiment 2/30 Normandie-Niémen (Régiment de chasse 2/30 Normandie-Niémen, flying Rafale. The unit is called Regiment instead of Squadron out of tradition).
          - Fighter Squadron 3/30 Lorraine (Escadron de Chasse 3/30 Lorraine, flying Rafale).
        - 5th Fighter Wing (5e escadre de chasse) (BA 115 Orange-Caritat Air Base).
          - Fighter Squadron 1/5 Vendée (Escadron de chasse 1/5 Vendée, flying Rafale).
        - 8th Fighter Wing (8e escadre de chasse) (BA 120 Cazaux Air Base).
          - Training Squadron 3/8 Côte d'Or (Escadron d'entraînement 3/8 Côte d'Or, the French Air and Space Force's aggressor squadron flying Alpha Jet).
        - Separate squadrons:
          - Rafale Conversion Squadron 3/4 Aquitaine (Escadron de Transformation Rafale 3/4 Aquitaine (the combined air force / navy Rafale OCU based at the Base aérienne 113 Saint-Dizier, attached to the Strategic Air Forces Command's 4th Fighter Wing and carrying on the traditions of combat and training strategic bomber units, but part of the BAAC).
          - Fighter Squadron 3/11 Corse (Escadron de chasse 3/11 Corse (Mirage 2000-5F squadron, based at BA 188 Djibouti Air Base, carrying on the long standing French-Djibouti military co-operation).
          - Fighter Squadron 1/7 Provence (Escadron de chasse 1/7 Provence (Rafale squadron permanently deployed to Base aérienne 104 Al Dhafra, the French facility at the UAE's Al Dhafra Air Base).
      - Intelligence, surveillance and reconnaissance units:
        - 33rd Surveillance, Reconnaissance and Attack Wing (33e escadre de surveillance, de reconnaissance et d'attaque) (BA 709 Cognac-Châteaubernard Air Base).
          - UAV Squadron 1/33 Belfort (Escadron de drones 1/33 Belfort, operational General Atomics MQ-9 Reaper squadron).
          - UAV Squadron 2/33 Savoie (Escadron de drones 2/33 Savoie, operational General Atomics MQ-9 Reaper squadron).
          - OCU UAV Squadron 3/33 Moselle (Escadron de Transformation Opérationnelle Drones 3/33 Moselle, the OCU General Atomics MQ-9 Reaper squadron).
          - Reconnaissance Squadron 4/33 Périgord (Escadron de reconnaissance 4/33 Périgord, intelligence gathering squadron flying Beech 350ER/ALSR 'VADOR' aircraft).
      - Surface-to-air missile units (each ADSA squadron is composed of two batteries of SAMP/T and one battery of Crotale NG SAMs):
        - Air Defence Surface-to-Air Wing – 1st Air Defence Artillery Regiment (Escadre sol-air de défense aérienne – 1er régiment d'artillerie de l'air), based at Avord Air Base (BA 702).
          - Air Defence Surface-to-Air Squadron 02.950 "Sancerre" (Escadron de défense sol-air 02.950 "Sancerre").
          - Technical Support Surface-to-Air Squadron (Escadron de soutien technique sol-air 2E.950).
          - Air Defence Surface-to-Air Training Center (Centre de formation de la défense sol-air 14.950).
        - Air Defence Surface-to-Air Squadron 01.950 "Crau" (Escadron de défense sol-air 01.950 "Crau") (Base aérienne 125 Istres-Le Tubé).
        - Air Defence Surface-to-Air Squadron 05.950 "Barrois" (Escadron de défense sol-air 05.950 "Barrois") (Base aérienne 113 Saint-Dizier-Robinson).
        - Air Defence Surface-to-Air Squadron 12.950 "Tursan" (Escadron de défense sol-air 12.950 "Tursan") (Base aérienne 118 Mont-de-Marsan).
    - Commandant of the Air Force Brigade of Assault and Projection (BAAP) (Orléans – Bricy Air Base) (French: Brigade Aérienne d'Appui et de Projection (BAAP)), is responsible for all tactical transport and liaison aircraft (aircraft and helicopters: Transall, C-160, Hercules C-130, A310/319, Dassault Falcon 50/900, Aérospatiale SA 330 Puma, Eurocopter Fennec, Eurocopter AS332 Super Puma, SOCATA TBM). Commanded by an officer in the rank of a General of Air Brigade.
    - Commandant of the Air Force Brigade of Special Forces (BFSA) (Orange – Caritat Air Base). Air Force Special Forces Brigade (Brigade des forces spéciales air (BFSA)) was created in 2020 on the basis of the former Air Force Security Forces Brigade. In the 2020–2021 period the French Air and Space Force overhauled the force structure of its security and firefighting and rescue units, which were previously grouped together in the Air Force Security and Intervention Forces Brigade (BAFSI)). The brigade combines the aerial special operations assets of the air force (the fixed-wing Escadron de transport 3/61 'Poitou' and the rotary wing Escadron d'hélicoptères 1/67 'Pyrénées'), the land warfare special units Air Parachute Commando No. 10 (covert and direct action), No. 20 (installation defence) and No. 30 (combat search and rescue), the security companies of the various air bases (les escadrons de protection), The Operational Training Center for [Land Warfare] Air Force Combatants (Centre de préparation opérationnel des combattants de l'Armée de l'air (CPOCAA)) at the Rochefort Air Base as well as the air force's Survival and Rescue Training Center (Centre de formation à la survie et au sauvetage (CFSS)) at Cazaux Air Base. Commanded by an officer in the rank of a General of Air Brigade.
  - Academic establishments:
    - Commandant of the Centre d'expertise aérienne militaire (CEAM) (Mont-de-Marsan Air Base), officer in the rank of a General of Air Brigade.
    - Commandant of the Centre for Strategic Aerospatial Studies (CESA) (Paris), officer in the rank of a General of Air Brigade.
  - Physician Assistant on Health Matters to the MGAAE (médecin adjoint santé auprès du MGAAE).
- Air and Space Force Staff (État-major de l'armée de l'air et de l'espace).
  - Deputy Chief of Staff for Plans and Programmes (sous-chef d'état-major Plans-Programme (SCPP)) in charge of preparation of armaments and equipment programmes, officer in the rank of a General of Air Division (a Major-General equivalent).
  - Deputy Chief of Staff for Activities (sous-chef d'état-major activité (SCAc)) in charge of operational readiness, application and support of the forces, training directives and personnel instruction, officer in the rank of a General of Air Division.
  - Deputy Chief of Staff for Performance and Synthesis (sous-chef d'état-major performance-synthèse (SCPS)) for the supervision of Air Force cross-functional projects, information management, performance management and control of Air Force activities, officer in the rank of a General of Air Division.
  - General Officer in Charge of External Relations (officier général délégué aux relations extérieures (OGDRE)) in charge of bilateral cooperation with foreign air forces and support for exports, officer in the rank of a General of Air Brigade (a Brigadier General equivalent).
  - General Officer for Nuclear Matters and Security (officier général nucléaire et sécurité (OGNS)) in charge of Air Force policy on the control and prevention of nuclear, radiological, biological and chemical (NRBC) risks, officer in the rank of a General of Air Brigade.
  - General Officer for Cybersecurity (officier général au numérique (OGNUM)), officer in the rank of a General of Air Brigade.
  - General Officer for Maintenance in Opetrational Condition (officier général au maintien en condition opérationnelle aéronautique (OGMCO)), officer in the rank of a General of Air Brigade.
  - General Officer for Very High Altitudes (officier général au très haute altitude (OGTRA)) in charge of exploitation of the space domain, officer in the rank of a General of Air Brigade.
- Inspector of the Air and Space Force (IAAE), officer in the rank of General of Air Corps.
- Director for Human Resources of the Air and Space Force (DRHAAE), officer in the rank of General of Air Corps.
- Territorial Commander of the Air and Space Force (CTAAE, formerly the Air Forces Command.), officer in the rank of General of Air Corps.
- Commander of Air Defence and Air Operations (CDAOA), officer in the rank of General of Air Corps.
- Commander of Strategic Air Forces (CFAS), officer in the rank of General of Air Corps.
- Commander of Space Command (CDE), officer in the rank of General of Air Division.

=== Commands ===
The French Air and Space Force has had three commands: two grand operational commands (CDAOA and CFAS) and one organic command (CFA).

- Commandement de la Défense Aérienne et des Opérations Aériennes (English: Air Defense and Air Operations Command (CDAOA)), is responsible for surveillance of French airspace, as well as all aerial operations in progress. It does not possess aircraft. Instead it exercises operational control over units of the Air Forces Command (CFA).
  - Air Defence and Air Operations Staff (French: État-major de la défense aérienne et des opérations aériennes) composed of the:
    - Air Force Operational Staff (French: État-major opérationnel Air (EMO-Air)).
    - Permanent readiness command center (French: Centre de permanence Air), both situated at the Balard complex (the French Air and Space Force main HQ).
    - Direct reporting units:
      - Air Force Operations Brigade (French: Brigade aérienne des opérations (BAO)) (all units at BA 942 Lyon-Mont Verdun air base).
        - National Air Operations Center (French: Centre national des opérations aériennes (CNOA)).
        - Core Joint Force Air Component HQ (Core JFAC HQ).
        - Analysis and Simulation Center for Air Operations Preparation (French: Centre d’analyse et de simulation pour la préparation aux opérations aériennes (CASPOA)).
      - Air Force Operational Awareness and Planning Brigade (French: Brigade aérienne connaissance-anticipation (BACA)).
        - Air Force Intelligence Center (French: Centre de renseignement air (CRA)) at BA 942 Lyon-Mont Verdun air base.
        - National Target Designation Center (French: Centre national de ciblage (CNC)) at BA 110 Creil-Senlis air base.
        - Land-based Electronic Warfare Squadron (French: Escadron électronique sol (EES)) at BA 123 Orléans-Bricy air base.
        - Intelligence Training Squadron 20.530 (French: Escadron de formation au renseignement (EFR) 20.530) (Metz), training air and space force and naval officers, integrated in the Joint Intelligence Training Center (CFIAR) in Strasbourg.
      - Air Force Brigade for Permanent Aerial Security Readiness (Brigade aérienne de la posture permanente de la sûreté aérienne (BAPPS)), based at BA 942 Lyon-Mont Verdun air base, created at the end of 2020 and in charge of air policing.
      - Air Force Brigade for Airspace Control (Brigade aérienne du contrôle de l'espace aérien (BACEA)), based at BA 942 Lyon-Mont Verdun air base, created in 2023 in line with Plan Altaïr for the reorganisation of the French Air and Space Force. Created by the merger of the former Airspace Control Brigade (Brigade Aérienne de Contrôle de l'Espace (BACE)) and the Information and Communication Systems component (Systèmes d'information et de communication) of the Air Force Brigade for Aerial Maneuver Support (Brigade aérienne d'appui à la manœuvre aérienne). The BACE was responsible for (Airborne early warning and control aircraft, and ground radar, ground-based air defense systems and missile defence, communication networks) airspace surveillance, constituting the Système de Commandement et de Conduite des Opérations Aérospatiales). Since 2007 the command, control and information systems network of the air and space force have been is integrated into the Joint Directorate of Infrastructure Networks and Information Systems (DIRISI)). With the creation of the BACEA the surface-to-air missile squadrons were transferred to the Air Force Fighter Aviation Brigade. The annual post-statement of the Air Defence and Air Operations Command (COMMANDEMENT DE LA DÉFENSE AÉRIENNE ET DES OPÉRATIONS AÉRIENNES) describes the new brigade as a formation of 57 subordinated units and its HQ in Bordeaux, fulfilling the following key tasks: tactical control of air assets (contrôle tactique), aerial transit control of air assets (contrôle en route), air traffic control (contrôle de circulation aérienne), support of the information and communication systems of the air force (soutien des Sic Aéronautiques), training and expertise in air traffic management (formation et expertise ATM), forward deployment of information and communication systems and command and control assets (projection SIC et du C2 tactique).
        - Detection and control centers:
          - Detection and Control Center 07.927 (French: Centre de détection et de contrôle (CDC)) Tours – Cinq-Mars-la-Pile (Codename: Raki, AOR: Northwestern France).
          - Detection and Control Center 04.930 (French: Centre de détection et de contrôle (CDC)) Mont-de-Marsan (Codename: Marina, AOR: Southwestern France).
          - Detection and Control Center 05.942 (French: Centre de détection et de contrôle (CDC)) Lyon – Mont Verdun (Codename: Rambert, AOR: Southeastern France).
        - Airborne airspace surveillance units:
          - 36th Airborne Command and Control Wing (36e escadre de commandement et de conduite aéroportés (36e EC2A)), based at Avord Air Base (BA 702).
            - 36th Airborne Command and Control Squadron "Berry" (36^{e} escadron de détection et de contrôle aéroportés Berry), flying the Boeing E-3F Sentry.
        - Ground-based airspace surveillance units:
          - GRAVES System.
          - 3 surveillance and air defence radar installations equipped with the Ground Master 406 radar: années 2010 trois Ground Master 406, le premier installé en Guyane, le second sur la base aérienne de Nice en 2017 et le troisième sur la Base aérienne 942 and at Lyon-Mont Verdun Air Base (BA 942) in 2019.
          - 12 surveillance and air defence radar installations equipped with the Ground Master 403T radar in metropolitan France, re-equipped in the 2019–2022 period.
        - Airspace controle of military air bases:
          - Units for local aerospace surveillance of the immediate environs of air bases (CLA).
          - Approach radars and landing aide systems.
        - Surface-to-air signals units in metropolitan France (METEOR system, in process of replacement by the SRSA system).
          - Expeditionary Command and Control Air Force Wing 00.550 (Escadre aérienne de commandement et de conduite projetable 00.550 (EAC2P 00.550)), based at Évreux-Fauville Air Base (BA 105) and formed on August 27, 2015, on the basis of the former Groupement tactique des systèmes d’information et de communication (GTSICAéro).
            - Wing Command (Commandement d'escadre 00.550).
            - Tactical Telecommunications Systems Squadron 11.550 (Escadron des systèmes de télécommunication tactiques 11.550).
            - Tactical Surveillance Systems Squadron 12.550 (Escadron des systèmes de surveillance tactiques 12.550).
            - Tactical Information Systems Squadron 13.550 (Escadron des systèmes d’information tactiques 13.550).
            - Tactical Training and Expertise Squadron 14.550 (Escadron d'expertise et d'instruction tactiques 14.550).
- Strategic Air Forces Command (CFAS), is responsible for the air force's nuclear strike units (Dassault Rafale B armed with ASMP-A missiles), as well as the tanker / strategic transport aircraft (Airbus A330 MRTT).
  - Command HQ (Commandement des CFAS), based at Vélizy-Villacoublay Air Base (BA 107).
  - 4th Fighter Wing (4e Escadre de chasse (4e EC)), based at Saint-Dizier – Robinson Air Base (BA 113).
    - Wing Command (Commandement d'escadre 00.113).
    - Fighter Squadron 01.004 "Gascogne" (Escadron de chasse 01.004 Gascogne), tactical nuclear strike fighter squadron, flying Rafale B variant.
    - Fighter Squadron 02.004 "La Fayette" (Escadron de Chasse 02.004 La Fayette), tactical nuclear strike fighter squadron, flying Rafale variant.
    - Rafale Conversion Squadron 03.004 "Aquitaine" (Escadron de transformation Rafale 03.004 Aquitaine), joint air force – navy OCU flying Rafale B/C/M variants.
    - Aeronautical Technical Support Squadron 15.004 "Haute-Marne" (Escadron de soutien technique aéronautique 15.004 Haute-Marne).
  - 31st Aerial Refuel and Strategic Transport Wing (31e Escadre aérienne de ravitaillement et de transport stratégiques (31e EARTS)), based at Istres-Le Tubé Air Base (BA 125).
    - Wing Command (Commandement d'escadre 00.113).
    - Aerial Refuel and Strategic Transport Squadron 01.031 "Bretagne" (Escadron de ravitaillement en vol et de transport stratégique 01.031 Bretagne), flying the Airbus A330 MRTT.
    - Operational Conversion Squadron 03.031 "Phénix" (Escadron de transformation Phénix 03.031 Landes), A330MRTT OCU.
    - Aerial Refuel and Strategic Transport Squadron "Esterel" (Escadron de ravitaillement en vol et de transport stratégique 02/031 Estérel), presidential air transport with the Airbus A330.
    - Aeronautical Technical Support Squadron 15.031 "Camargue" (Escadron de soutien technique aéronautique 15.031 Camargue).
    - Specialised Technical Support Squadron 15.093 (Escadron de soutien technique spécialisé 15.093).
- Territorial Command of the Air and Space Army (CTAAE), formerly the Air Forces Command, transformed into the CTAAE on March 22, 2023), Bordeaux-Mérignac Air Base, as an organic command, prepares units to fulfill operational missions. From September 2013, the former organic commands CFA and CSFA were merged into CFA.
  - Air Force Firefighters Brigade (Brigade des pompiers de l’air (BPA)), formed in 2021. It brings together the rescue and firefighting personnel (called incident technicians and grouped into squadrons of company size) of the Air Force into 25 units of around 1 500 personnel. HQ is in Cazaux Air Base (BA 120).
  - Air Force Aerial Weapon Systems Brigade (French: Brigade Aérienne des Systèmes d'Armes Aériens (BASAA)) provides the maintenance and repair of aerial weapons and target systems.
  - Air Force Maneuver Support Brigade (French: Brigade Aérienne d'Appui à la Manœuvre Aérienne (BAAMA)) provides the ground-based engineer and logistics personnel (including expeditionary) needed for the sustainment of air operations., based at Bordeaux–Mérignac Air Base (BA 106).
    - Operational Support Air Force Wing 00.513 (Escadre aérienne d'appui aux opérations 00.513 (EAAO 00.513)), based at Bordeaux-Mérignac Air Base (BA 106) and formed on November 24, 2021, on the basis of the former Groupement aérien d’appui aux opérations (GAAO).
      - Wing Command (Commandement d'escadre 00.513).
      - Operational Infrastructure Squadron 11.513 (Escadron d'infrastructure en opérations 11.513).
      - Operational Infrastructure Squadron 13.513 (Escadron d'infrastructure en opérations 13.513).
      - Operational Infrastructure Squadron 15.513 (Escadron d'infrastructure en opérations 15.513).
      - Expeditionary Training Squadron 17.513 (Escadron d'instruction au déploiement 17.513).
    - 25th Air Force Engineer Regiment (25ème Régiment du Génie de l’Air), army regiment permanently attached to the air force. Based at Istres-Le Tubé Air Base (BA 125).
      - 2nd Operational Air Force Engineer Company (2e Compagnie opérationnelle du génie de l’air (2e COGA)), based at Mont-de-Marsan Air Base (BA 118).
      - 4th Operational Air Force Engineer Company (4e Compagnie opérationnelle du génie de l’air (4e COGA)), based at Avord Air Base (BA 702).
    - Aeronautical Installations Air Force Groupment (Groupement aérien des installations aéronautiques (GAIA)), based at Bordeaux-Mérignac Air Base (BA 106).
- French Space Command (French: Commandement de l'espace (CDE)), HQ at Toulouse Space Centre.
  - Operational Preparation and Employment Division (Division préparation opérationnelle et emploi (DPOE)), Hexagone Balard, Paris.
  - Space Operations Air Force Brigade (Brigade aérienne des opérations spatiales (BAOS)), based at Toulouse Space Center. By 2025 the CMOS and the COSMOS will relocate to Toulouse Space Center as well. In preparation for this the French Air and Space Force has formed the military installation FA 101 (Formation administrative (FA 101)) on the premises of the space center.
    - Space Operations Command and Control Center (Centre de Commandement et de Contrôle des opérations spatiales (C3OS)), based at Toulouse Space Center.
    - Satellite Observation Military Center 01.092 "Bourgogne" (French: Centre militaire d’observation par satellites (CMOS) 01.092 Bourgogne), based at Creil-Senlis Air Base (BA 110).
    - Operational Center for Military Surveillance of Space Objects (French: Centre opérationnel de surveillance militaire des objets spatiaux (COSMOS)), based at Lyon – Mont Verdun Air Base (BA 942).

The official designation of the service was changed in July 2019 from Air Army (Armée de l'Air) to Air and Space Army (Armée de l'air et de l'espace), when the previous joint Inter-Service Space Command (Commandement interarmées de l'espace (CIE)) under the French General Staff was transformed into the Space Command (Commandement de l'espace (CDE)) and absorbed into the Air and Space Force as its fourth command.

All air regions were disestablished on 1 January 2008. In the 1960s, there were five air regions (RA). The number was then reduced to four by a decree of 30 June 1962 with the disestablishment of the 5th Aerial Region (French North Africa). The decree of 14 July 1991 reduced the air regions to three: « RA Atlantic », « RA Mediterranean » and « RA North-East ». On 1 July 2000 was placed into effect an organization consisting of « RA North » (RAN) and « RA South » (RAS). The territorial division was abolished by decree n°2007-601 of 26 April 2007.

From 2008 to 2010 the French Air Force underwent the "Air 2010" streamlining process. The main targets of this project were to simplify the command structure, to regroup all military and civil air force functions and to rationalise and optimise all air force units. Five major commands, were formed, instead of the former 13, and several commands and units were disbanded.

=== Support services ===
The Directorate of Human Resources of the Air and Space Force (DRH-AAE) recruits, trains, manages, administers, and converts personnel of the Air and Space Force. Since January 2008, the DRH-AAE groups the former Air Force directorate of military personnel (DPMMA) and some tasks of the former Air Force Training Command. The directorate is responsible for Air and Space Force recruitment via the recruiting bureau.

French joint defence service organisations, supporting the air and space force, include:

- The Integrated Structure of Maintaining Operational Conditioning of Aeronautical Defense Materials (French: Structure Intégrée de Maintien en Condition Opérationnelle des Matériels Aéronautiques de la Défense) (SIMMAD).
- The Service industriel de l'aéronautique (SIAE), a 4700-person maintenance organization, internal to the French air force, in charge of 20% of the heavy maintenance of French armed forces, the other 80% being the responsibility of private aeronautics companies.
- The "Air Commissariat" (French: Commissariat de l'Air) between 1947 and 2007, then "Financial and General Administration Service" (French: " Service de l'Administration Générale et des Finances " (SAGF)) from 2008 until 2009, and finally the "Commissariat Service of the Armed Forces" (SCA) (French: Service du Commissariat des Armées) since 2010, have successively been designated as administrative services of the French Air and Space Force. The Commissioners as well as Civilians of this service carry out : operations support, individual legal rights, judicial, internal control accountability, financial and purchase executions, and support and protection of the combatant.

=== Wings ===
Commanded by a Lieutenant-colonel or Colonel, the Escadre is a formation that assembles various units and personnel dedicated to the same mission. In 1932, the "regiment" designation was replaced with "Escadre", which until 1994 was a unit consisting of the following:

- Units (escadrons or groups) generally equipped with the same type of aircraft or at least assuring the same type of mission.
- Units of maintenance and support.

Escadres (wings) were dissolved from 1993 as part of the Armées 2000 reorganisation, were reestablished in 2014. The problems caused by having the aircraft maintenance units not responsible to the flying squadrons they supported eventually forced the change.

Four Escadres were reformed in the first phase:

- 31e Escadre Aérienne de Ravitaillement et de Transport Stratégiques at Istres-Le Tubé Air Base on 27 August 2014.
- Escadre Sol-Air de Défense Aérienne – 1er Régiment d'Artillerie de l'Air (ESADA – 1^{er} RAA) at Avord Air Base (3 September 2014).
- 36e Escadre de Commandement et de Conduite Aéroportée at Avord Air Base on 5 September 2014.
- 3^{e} Escadre de Chasse at Nancy-Ochey Air Base (5 September 2014).

In the second phase, the French Air Force announced in August 2015 the creation of six additional wings:

- 8e Escadre de Chasse at Cazaux Air Base (25 August 2015).
- 4e Escadre de Chasse at Saint-Dizier ( 26 August 2015).
- 64e Escadre de Transport at Évreux-Fauville Air Base (27 August 2015).
- 2e Escadre de Chasse at Luxeuil – Saint-Sauveur Air Base (3 September 2015).
- 61e Escadre de Transport at Orléans – Bricy Air Base (1 September 2015).
- 30e Escadre de Chasse at Mont-de-Marsan Air Base (3 September 2015).

Also established was the Escadre aérienne de commandement et de conduite projetable at Évreux-Fauville Air Base on 27 August 2015.

The French Air and Space Force announced in August 2015 that unit numbering, moves of affected aircraft, and the transfer of historic material (flags, traditions and names) would be completed in 2016.

- 62e Escadre de Transport was re-constituted at Orléans – Bricy Air Base on 5 September 2017, taking over C-130 Hercules operations from 61e Escadre de Transport so the latter could specialise in A400M Atlas operations.

Another air force wing was added on September 5, 2019:

- 33e Escadre de surveillance, de reconnaissance et d'attaque at Cognac – Châteaubernard Air Base, operating the air and space force's drone fleet.

=== Squadrons and flights ===
Commanded by a lieutenant-colonel, the Escadron is the basic operational unit. This term replaced that of Group as of 1949 with the aim to standardize usage with the allies of NATO who were using the term 'squadron'. However, the term Group did not entirely disappear: the term was retained for the Aerial Group 56 Mix Vaucluse, specialized in Special Operations or Group – Groupe de ravitaillement en vol 2/91 Bretagne which is still carrying the same designation since 2004.

A fighter squadron (escadron) can number some twenty machines, spread in general in three Escadrilles. A Transport Escadron (Escadron de Transport) can theoretically count a dozen Transall C-160, however, numbers are usually much less for heavier aircraft (three Airbus A310-300 and two Airbus A340-200 for the Escadron de Transport 3/60 Estérel).

The squadrons have retained the designations of the former Escadres disbanded during the 1990s. For instance: Transport Escadron 1/64 Béarn (more specifically Transport Escadron 01.064 Béarn), which belonged to the 64th Transport Escadre (French: 64^{e} Escadre de Transport) during the dissolution of the later (recreated in August 2015). Not all escadrons (Squadrons) are necessarily attached to an Escadre.

The Escadrille (flight) has both an administrative and operational function, even of the essential operational control is done at the level of the Esacdron. A pilot is assigned to the Escadrille, however the equipment and material devices, on the other hand, are assigned to the Escadron. Since the ESTA (Aeronautic Technical Support Escadrons) came into being, material devices and the mechanics have been assigned directly to the base then put at disposition of the based Escadrons.

The Escadrilles adopted the traditions of the prestigious units out of which most (SPA and SAL), (Note: Designations of Escadrilles composed of the identifying number of material devices (for instance SPA for escadrille equipped with SPAD, N for Nieuport, SAL for Salmson, etc.) and an order number.) are those traditions of the First World War.

== Government and state transport ==
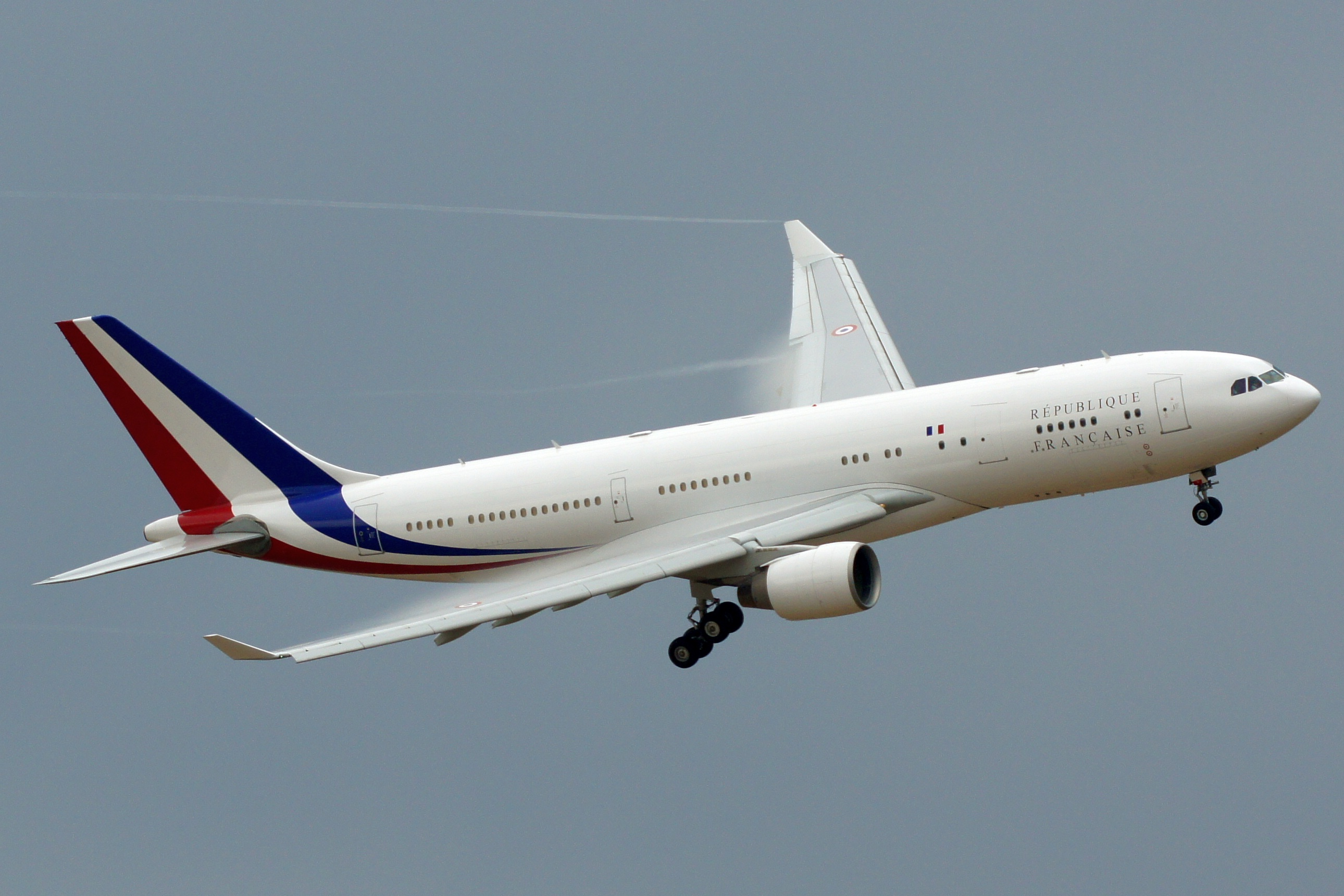
ETEC Airbus A330-200

The Escadron de transport, d'entraînement et de calibration 00.065 (ETEC 65, "Transportation, training and calibration squadron") is a unit of the French Air and Space Force, under direct command of the Minister of Defence, in charge of the transportation of the President, the Prime Minister and other French government officials. Flight are identified as "COTAM 0xy", with the callsign "COTAM 001" ("COTAM Unité") being reserved for the President and "COTAM 002" for foreign presidents.

=== Aircraft ===
The ETEC uses:

- 1 Airbus A330-200, Registration: F-RARF
- 2 Dassault Falcon 7X
- 2 Falcon 900 (soon to be replaced)
- Falcon 2000LX
- 7 Socata TBM 700
- 3 Eurocopter Super Puma helicopters (VIP-configured)

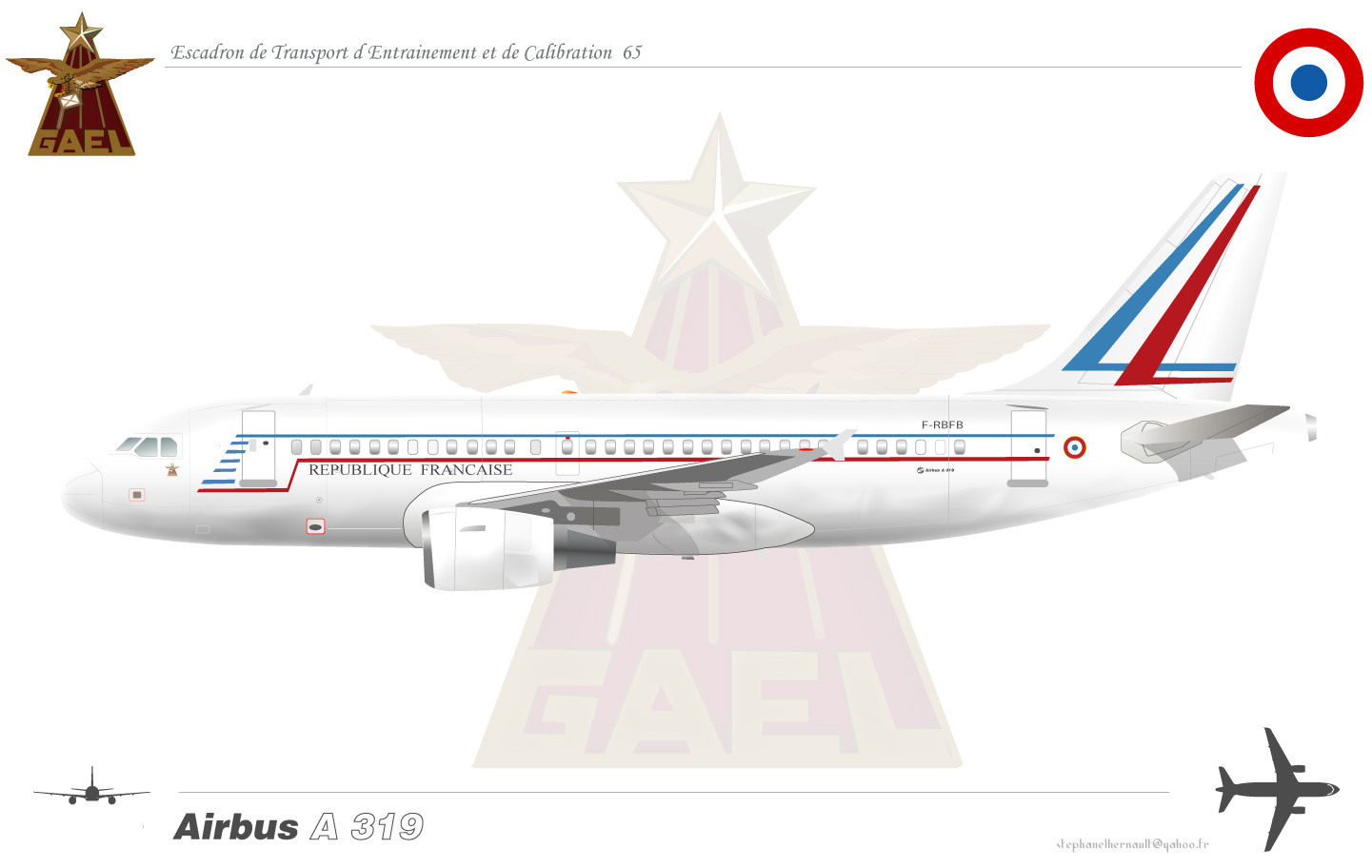
Airbus A319

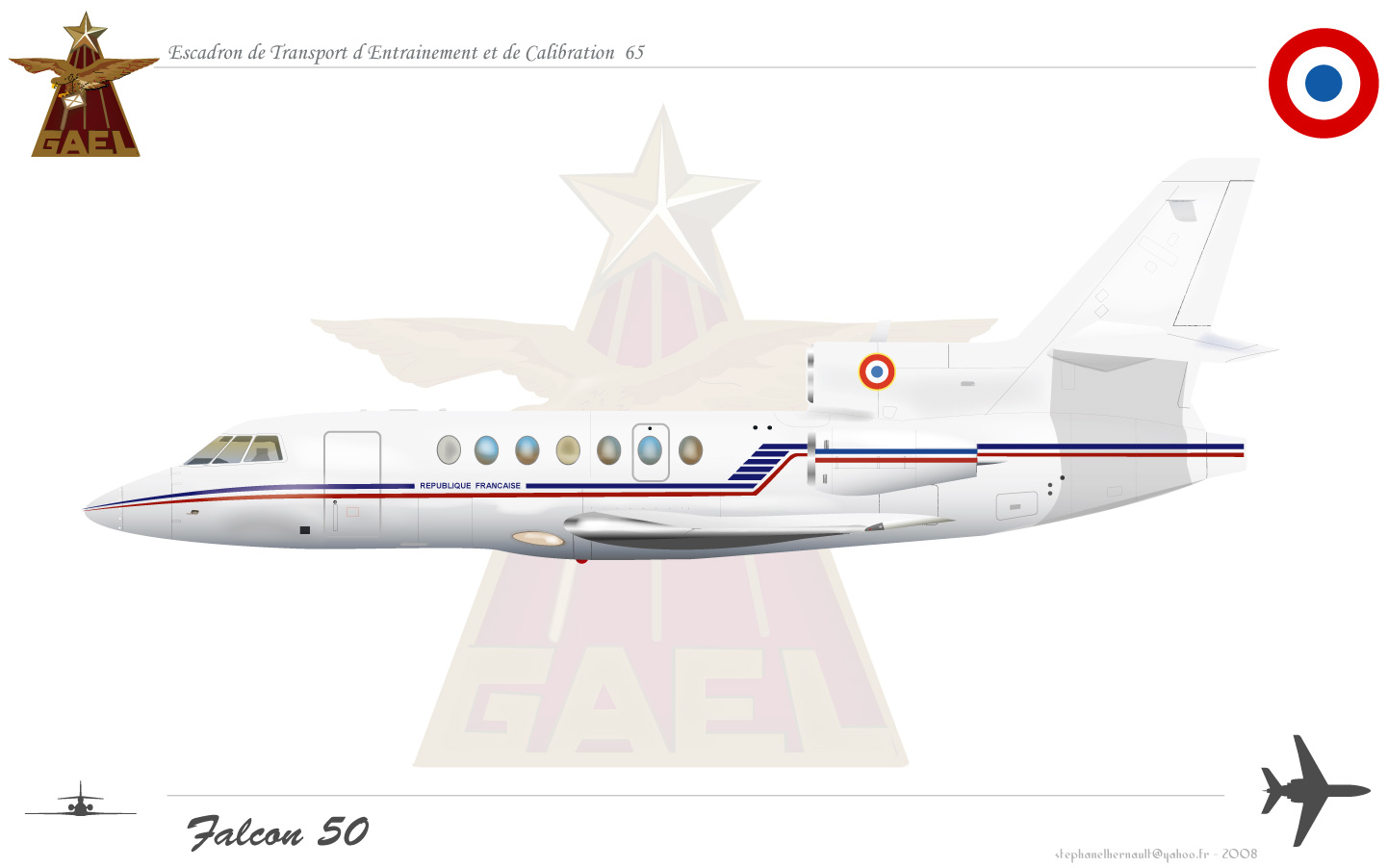
Dassault Falcon 50

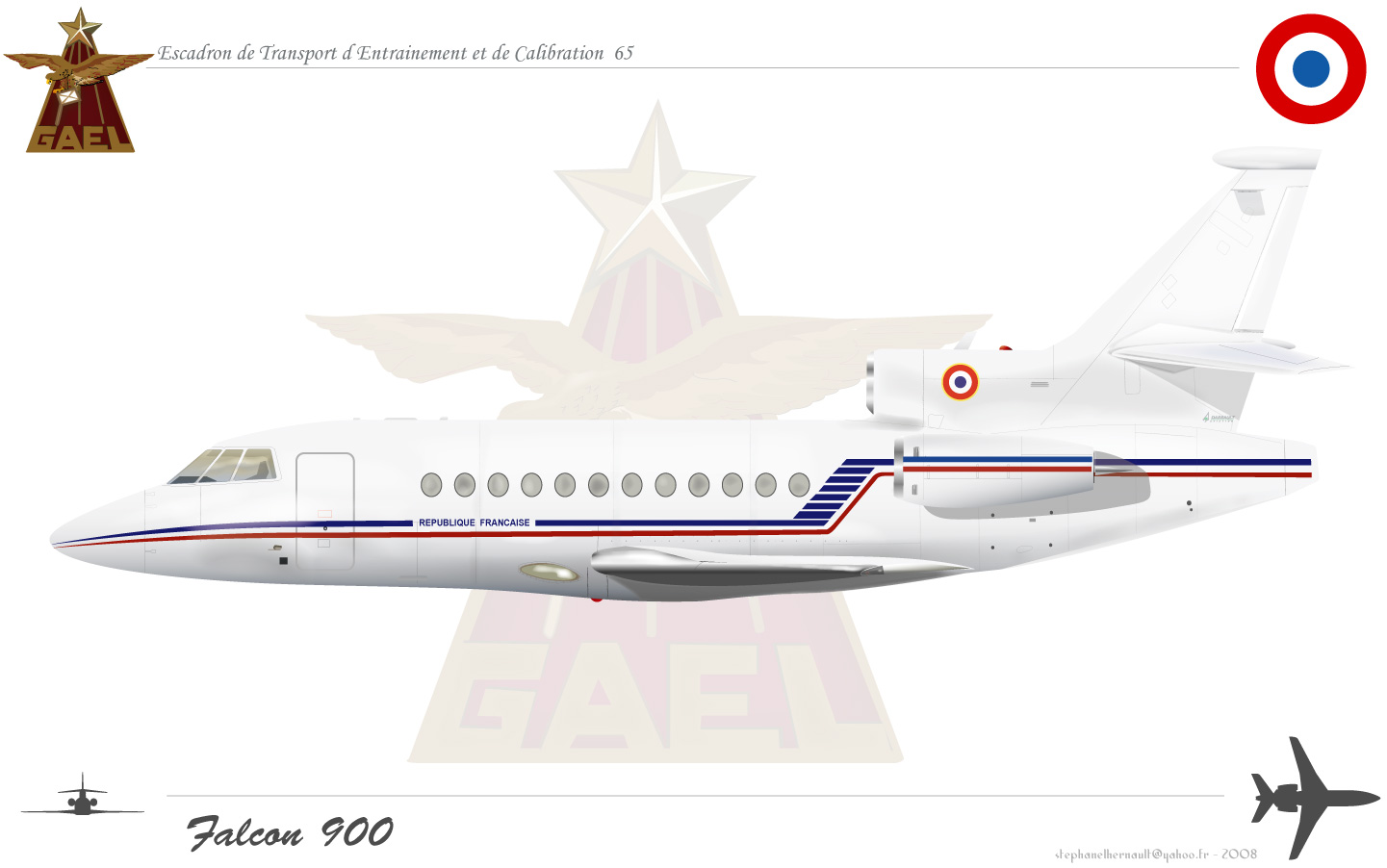
Dassault Falcon 900

=== Fusiliers Commandos de l'Air ===
The Fusiliers Commandos de l'Air comprise:

- Protection squadrons (French: Escadrons de protection) (EP)
- Air Parachute Commando 10 (French: Commando parachutiste de l'air) (CPA 10)
- Air Parachute Commando 20 (CPA 20)
- Air Parachute Commando 30 (CPA 30)

Protection Squadrons protect airbases inside and outside the national territory, and in exterior operations as well.

The CPAs carry out common missions, as well as specialized tasks including intervention and reinforcement of protection at the profit of sensible points "air" inside and outside the national territory.

== Air bases ==
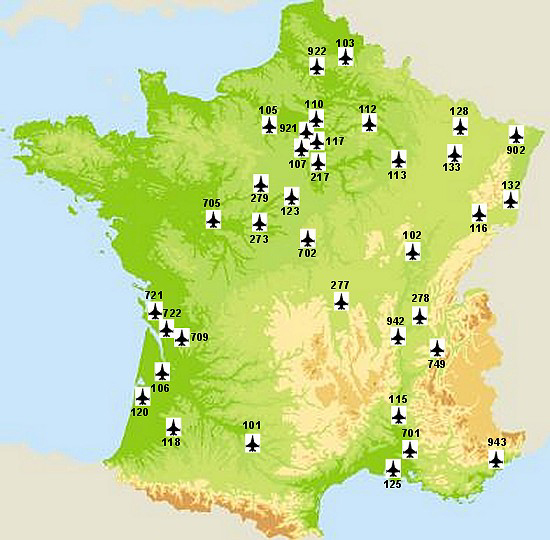
Air bases in Metropolitan France

Flying activity in France is carried out by a network of bases, platforms and French air and space defence radar systems. It is supported by bases, which are supervised and maintained by staff, operational centres, warehouses, workshops, and schools. Both in France and abroad, bases have similar infrastructure to provide standardised support.

The French Air and Space Force has, as of 1 August 2014:

- Within the metropolitan territory of France, 27 airbases, out of the which 18 aeronautical platform with perceived runways and 5 Bases non-platform, two schools, 3 air detachments and " one attached air element " (EAR).
- Beyond the metropole/Europe, 7 Aerial Bases or permanent detachments in overseas or country.

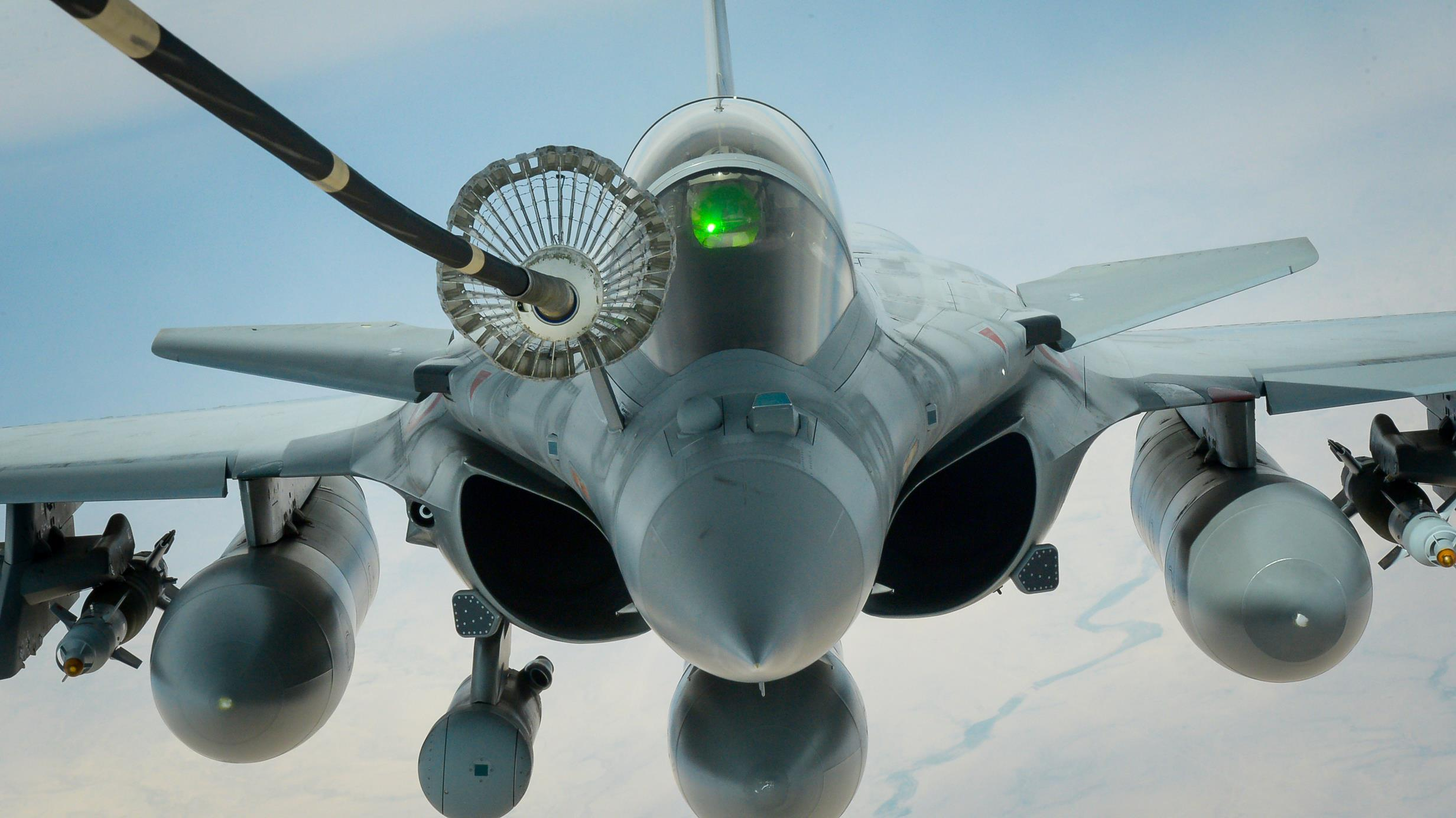
A French Air and Space Force Dassault Rafale B at RIAT in 2009

Some French airbases house radar units (e.g. Lyon, Mont-Verdun, Drachenbronn, Cinq-Mars-la-Pile, Nice, Mont-Agel) to carry out air defence radar surveillance and air traffic control. Others house material warehouses or command posts. Temporary and semi-permanent foreign deployments include transport aircraft at Dushanbe (Tajikistan, Operation Héraclès), and fighter aircraft in N'Djamena (Tchad, Opération Épervier), among others.

As swift as the French Air and Space Force operates, the closure of aerial bases is more constant and immediate, having known a strong acceleration since the 1950s. An air base commander has authority over all units stationed on their base. Depending on the units' tasks, this means that they are responsible for approximately 600 to 2500 personnel.

On average, a base, made up of about 1500 personnel (nearly 3500 people including family), provides a yearly economic boost to its area of about 60 million euros. Consequently, determining the sites for air bases constitutes a major part of regional planning.

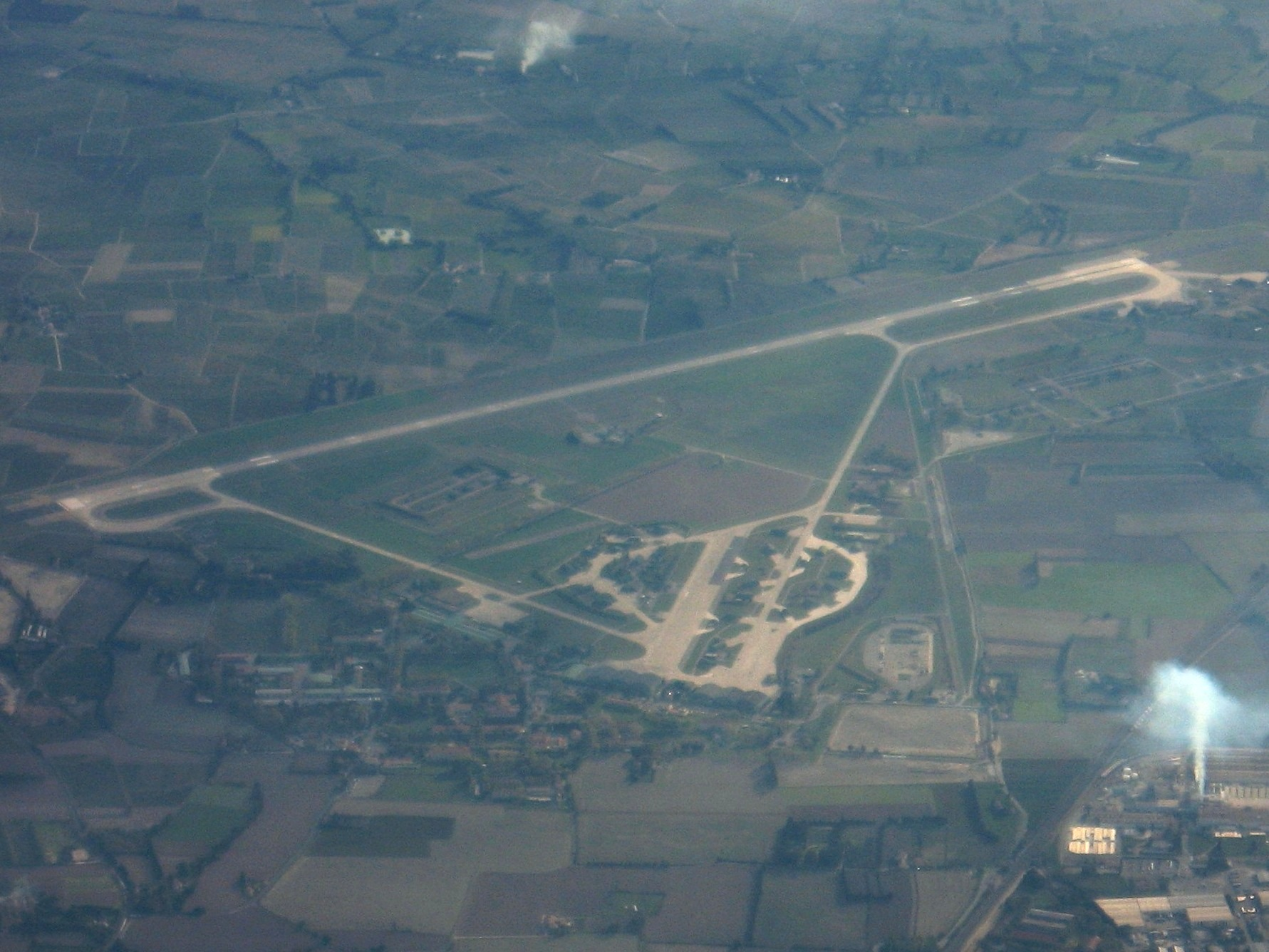
Orange-Caritat Air Base

- BA 105 Évreux-Fauville Air Base. Command, operational and logistic support. Air transport units with 27× CASA CN-235M, 10x C-130J/ KC-130J (6x from Luftwaffe and 4x from French Air Force).
- BA 107 Vélizy – Villacoublay Air Base. Helicopter and heavy air transport units.
- BA 113 Saint-Dizier – Robinson Air Base 4e Escadre de Chasse, 50× Rafale B and Rafale C (+ some Rafale M from ETR 3/4).
- BA 116 Luxeuil – Saint-Sauveur Air Base. Air defence fighter base with 23× Mirage 2000-5F.
- BA 123 Orléans – Bricy Air Base. Air transport units with 17× Airbus A400M Atlas and 18× Lockheed C-130 Hercules. CFPSAA operational command.
- BA 133 Nancy – Ochey Air Base. Three strike fighter squadrons units with 50× Mirage 2000D, SAM sqns.
- BA 279 Châteaudun Air Base. Airplane maintenance, repair and storage airbase.
- BA 702 Avord Air Base. CFAS nuclear strike stockpile. AWACS 4× E-3F Sentry unit.
- BA 705 Tours airbase. Fighter pilot training school were equipped with Alpha Jet. This school has been moved to BA 709 in 2020.
- DA 273 Romorantin air detachment. Logistics unit.
- BA 106 Bordeaux-Mérignac Airport. Transport support base for the air staff.
- BA 115 Orange-Caritat Air Base. 6× Mirage 2000B-S5 and 12x Rafale B and Rafale C.
- BA 118 Mont-de-Marsan Air Base. Home to 52× Rafale B and Rafale C. Home of CEAM, the Air and Space Force military experimentation and trials organisation, Air defence radar command reporting centre, and the air traffic control and air defence control training centre.
- BA 120 Cazaux Air Base, situated South-west of the port city of Bordeaux. Fighter pilot training squadron equipped with 45× Alpha Jet. Air and Space Force airplane stockpile.
- BA 125 Istres-Le Tubé Air Base. Inflight refueling unit with 13× Airbus A330 MRTT. CEAM – the Air and Space Force military test centre.
- BA 126 Solenzara Air Base. Fighter gunnery range. SAR unit.
- DA 277 Varennes-sur-Allier. Air and Space Force supply depot. DA 277 was dissolved on 30 June 2015.
- Air Base 278 Ambérieu. Logistic support base.
- BA 701 Salon-de-Provence Air Base. Presentation Team equipped with 12× Alpha Jet. Officer instruction school. Enlisted instruction school.
- BA 709 Cognac – Châteaubernard Air Base. Basic flight training school equipped with 17× Pilatus PC-21 and UAV squadron with 8× MQ-9 Reaper.
- Air Base 721 Rochefort Home of the NCO school, the École de formation des sous-officiers de l'armée de l'air.
- BA 942 Lyon – Mont Verdun Air Base. Air defence radar command reporting centre. National Air Operations Command (CNOA) location.
- EAR 943 Nice Mont-Agel. Air defence radar GM 406.
- DA 204 Bordeaux-Beauséjour air detachment. Logistic unit.
- EETAA 722 Saintes. Air and Space Force electronic, technical instruction also as Military basic Bootcamp.
- EPA 749 Grenoble. Air and Space Force child support school.

=== Overseas ===
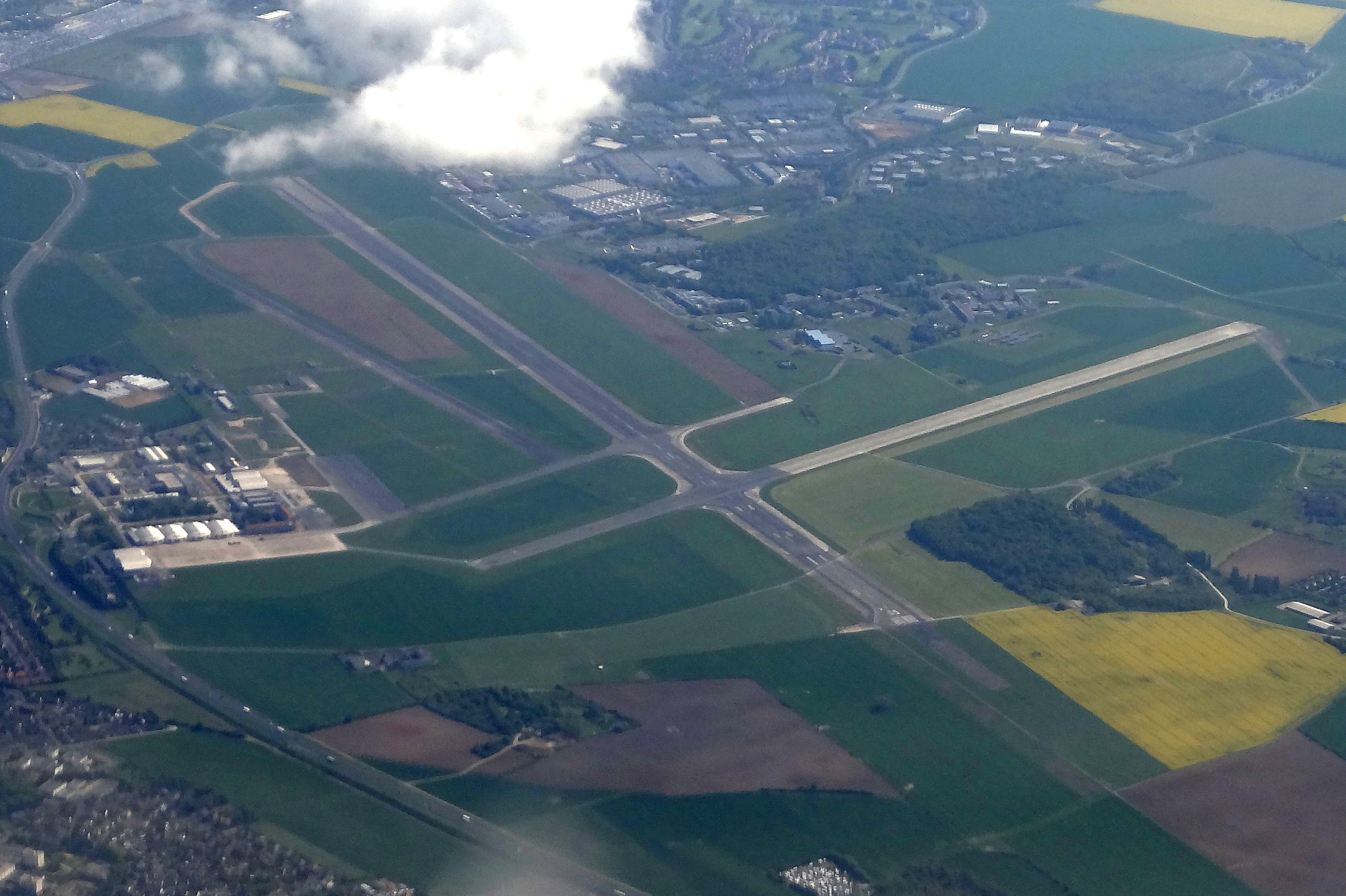
Brétigny-sur-Orge Air Base

- BA 181 Réunion, Indian Ocean
- BA 188 Djibouti, Africa. Mixed units
- Air elements Libreville/Gabon
- Air elements N’Djamena/Chad. Mixed units
- BA 190 French Polynesia (Overseas collectivity). Mixed unit
- BA 365 Martinique (French department), West Indies. Mixed unit
- BA 367 French Guiana (French department), South America. Mixed units
- BA 376 Base aérienne 186 Nouméa, New Caledonia (special collectivity of France)
- BA 104 Abu Dhabi

More than ten bases have been closed since 2009. Doullens Air Base (BA 922) was a former command and reporting centre; Toulouse – Francazal Air Base (BA 101), was closed on 1 September 2009; Colmar-Meyenheim Air Base (BA 132) was closed on 16 June 2010; Metz-Frescaty Air Base (BA 128) was closed on 30 June 2011; Brétigny-sur-Orge Air Base (BA 217), closed 26 June 2012; Cambrai – Épinoy Air Base (BA 103), was closed on 28 June 2012; Reims – Champagne Air Base (June 2012); Drachenbronn Air Base (BA 901) closed on 17 July 2015; Dijon Air Base (BA 102), was vacated on 30 June 2016; Creil Air Base (BA 110) vacated on 31 August 2016; and Taverny Air Base (DA 921), the former Strategic Air Forces Command headquarters.

== Equipment ==
=== Aircraft ===
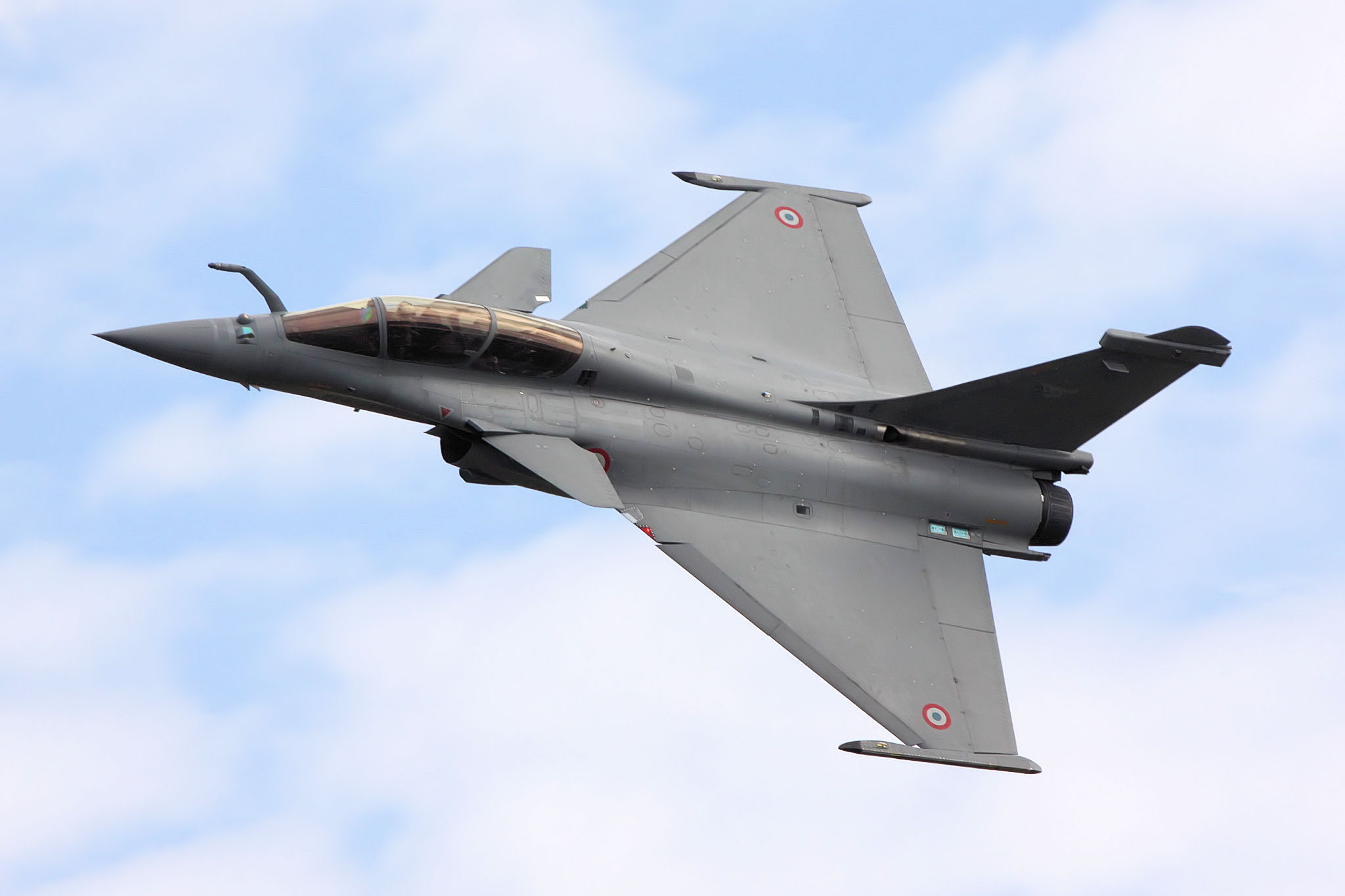
Dassault Rafale B

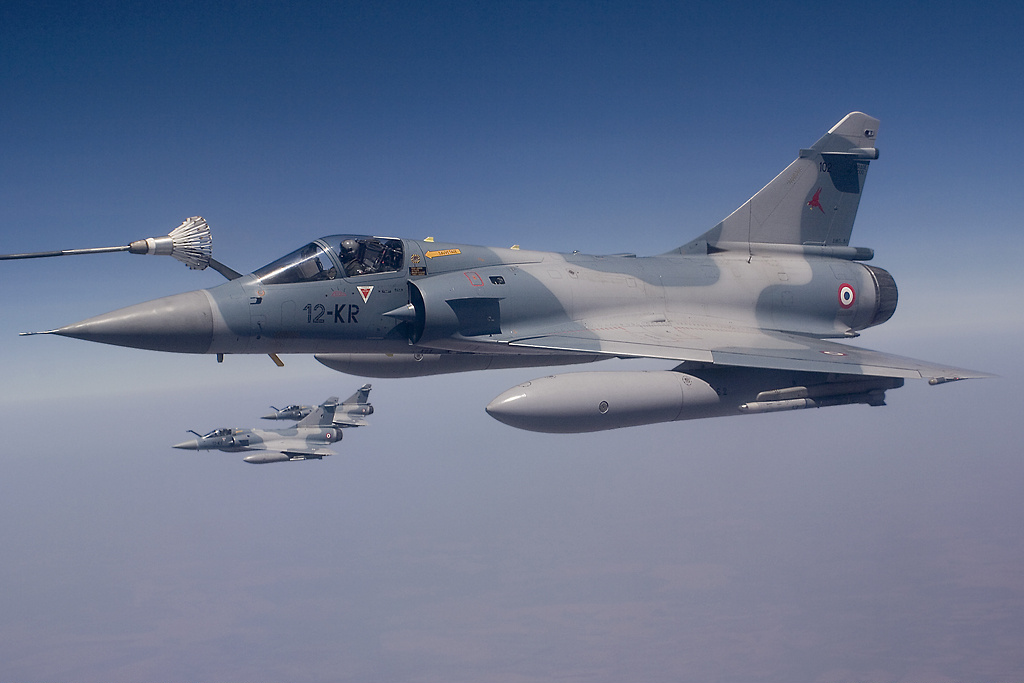
Dassault Mirage 2000

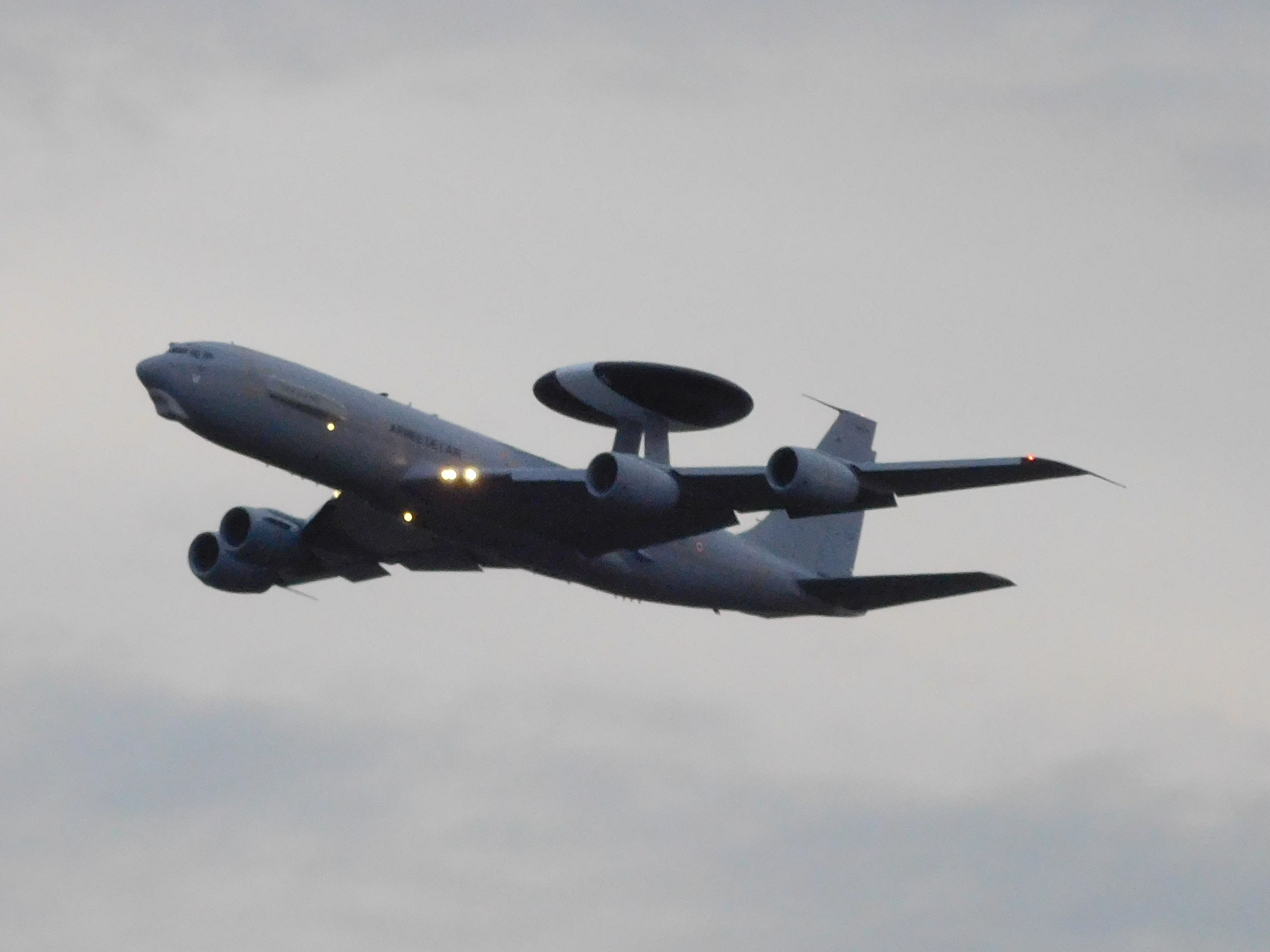
Boeing E-3 Sentry

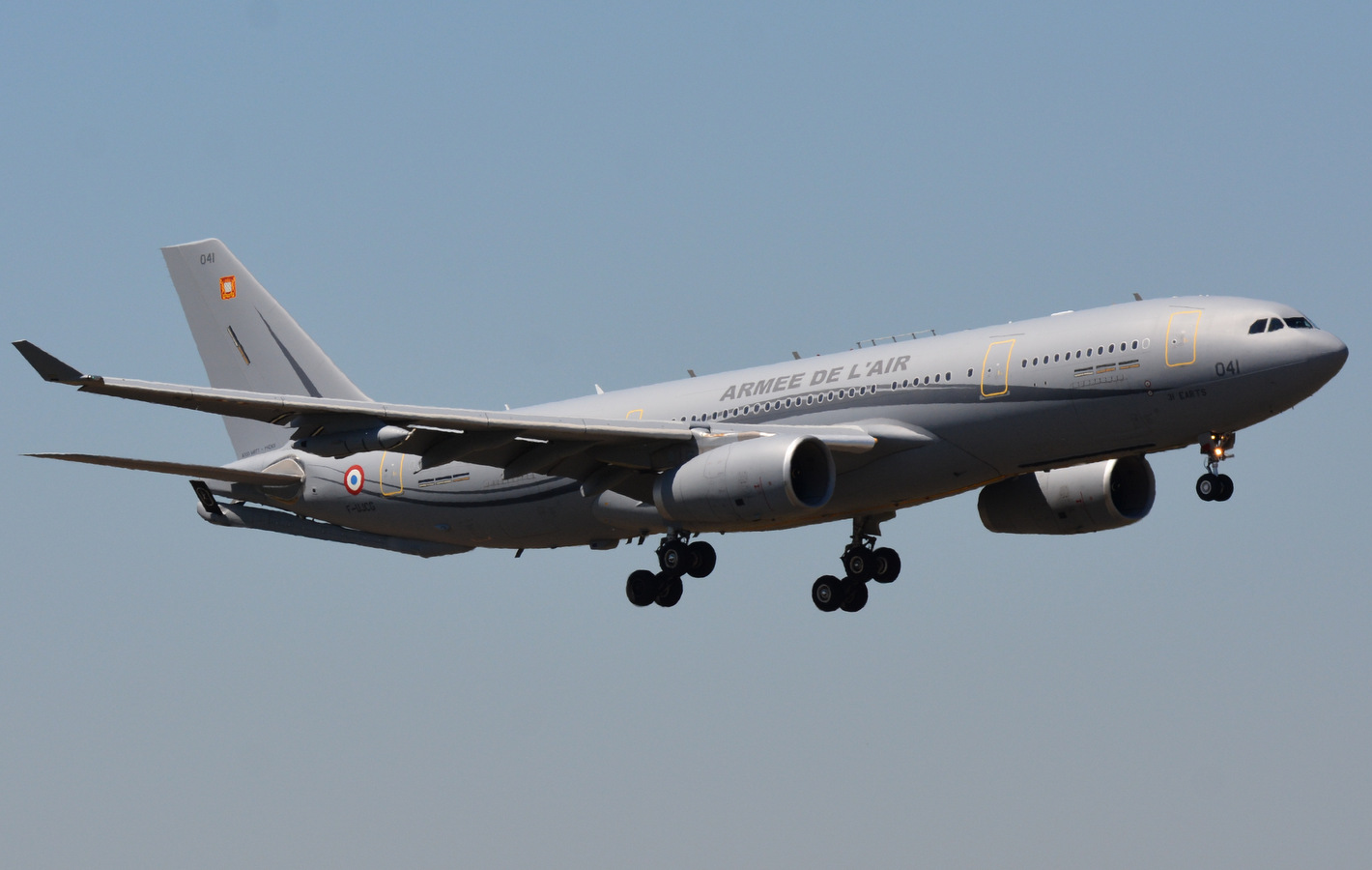
Airbus A330 MRTT Phénix

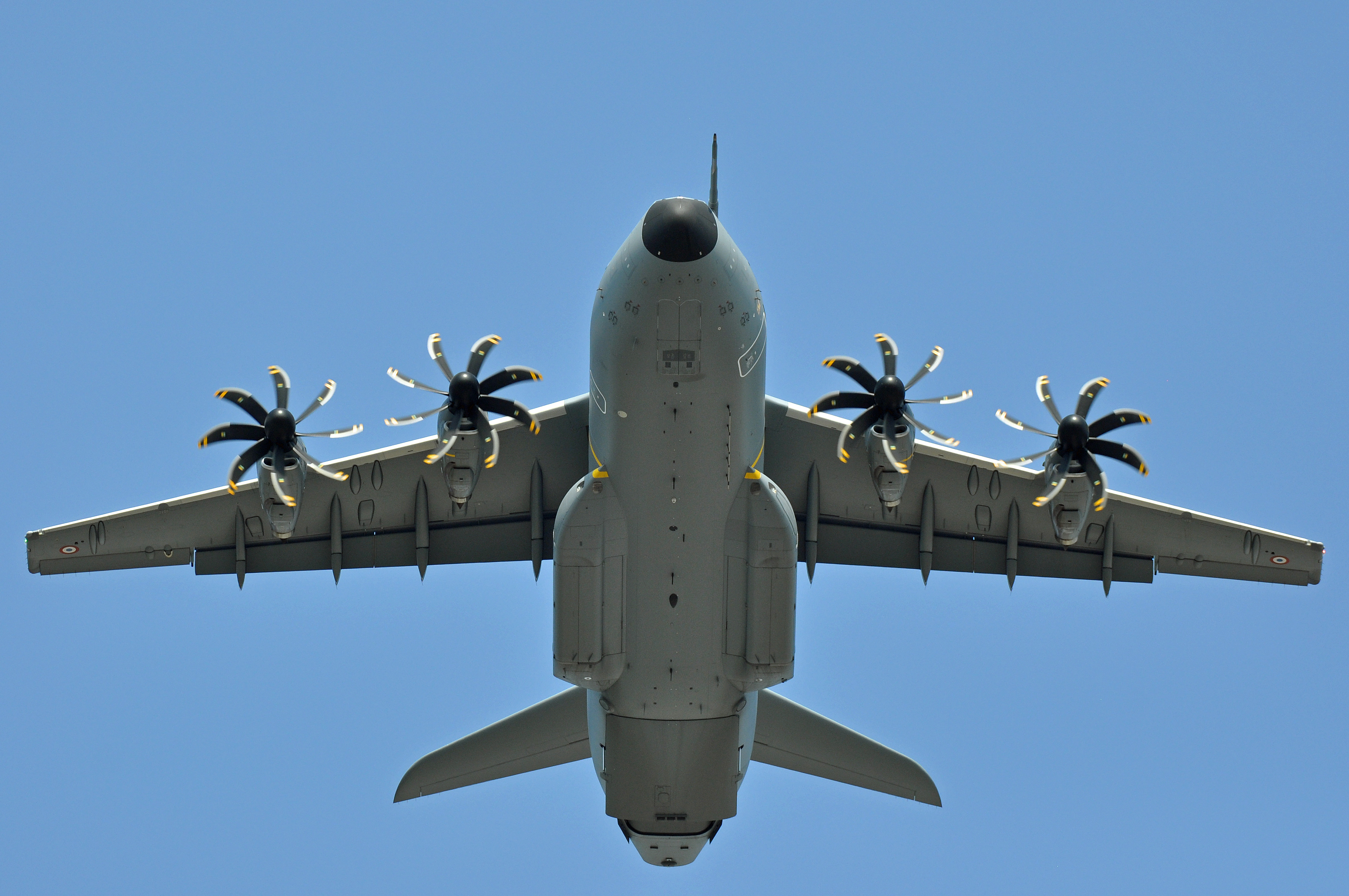
Airbus A400M Atlas

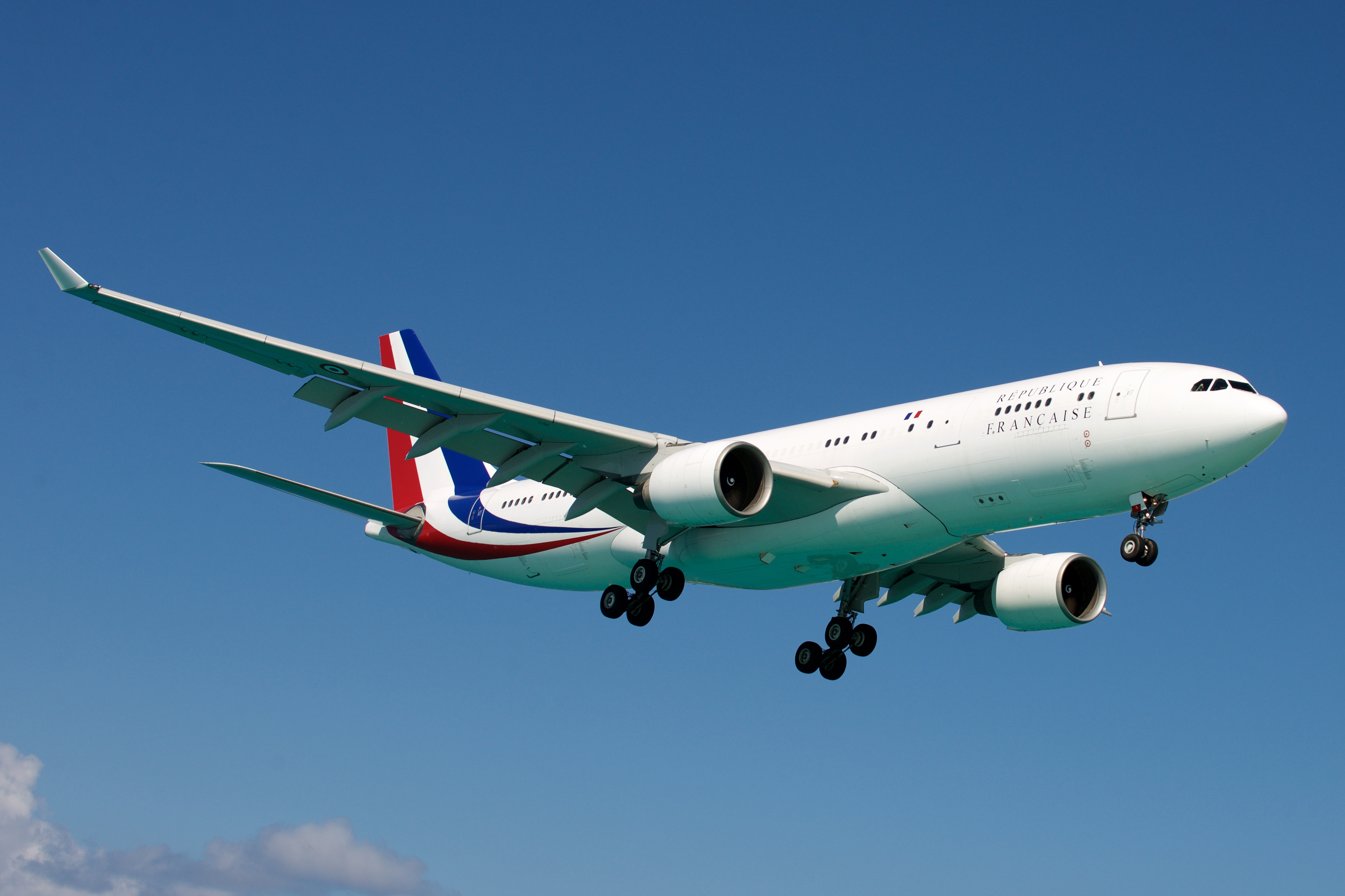
Airbus A330-200 - presidential aircraft

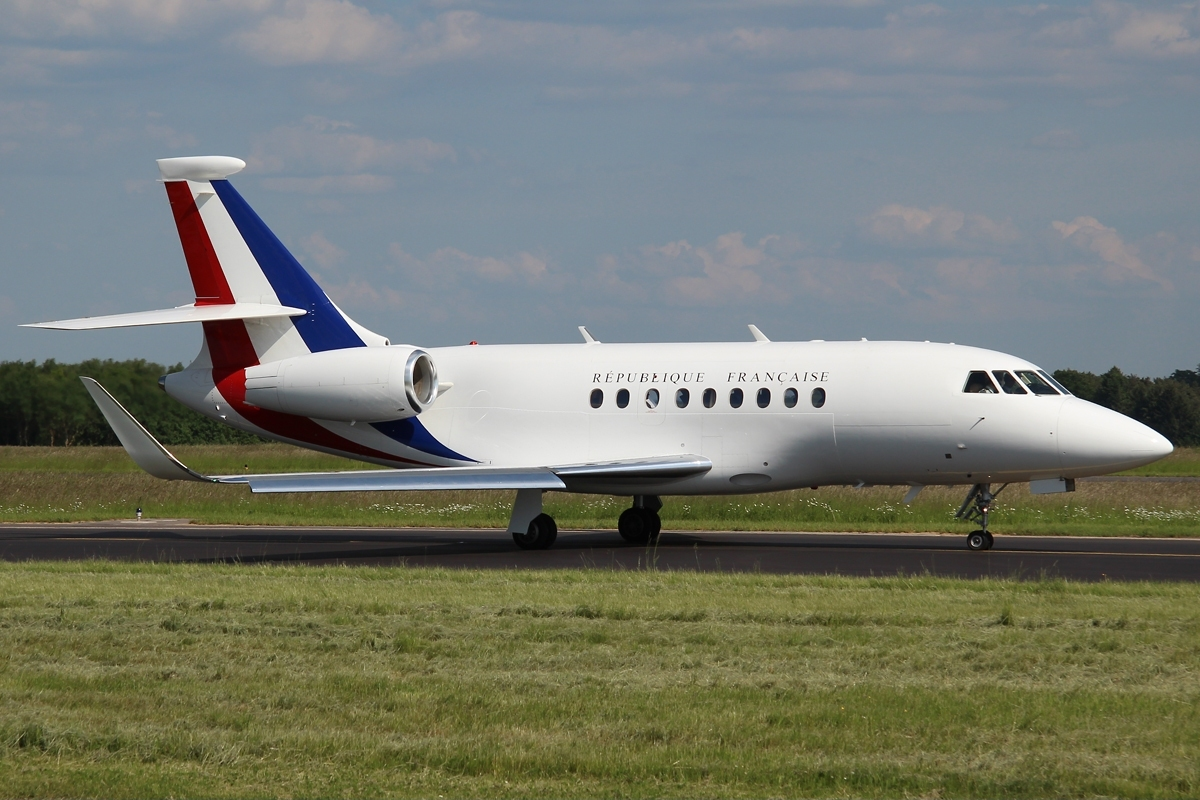
Dassault Falcon 2000EX

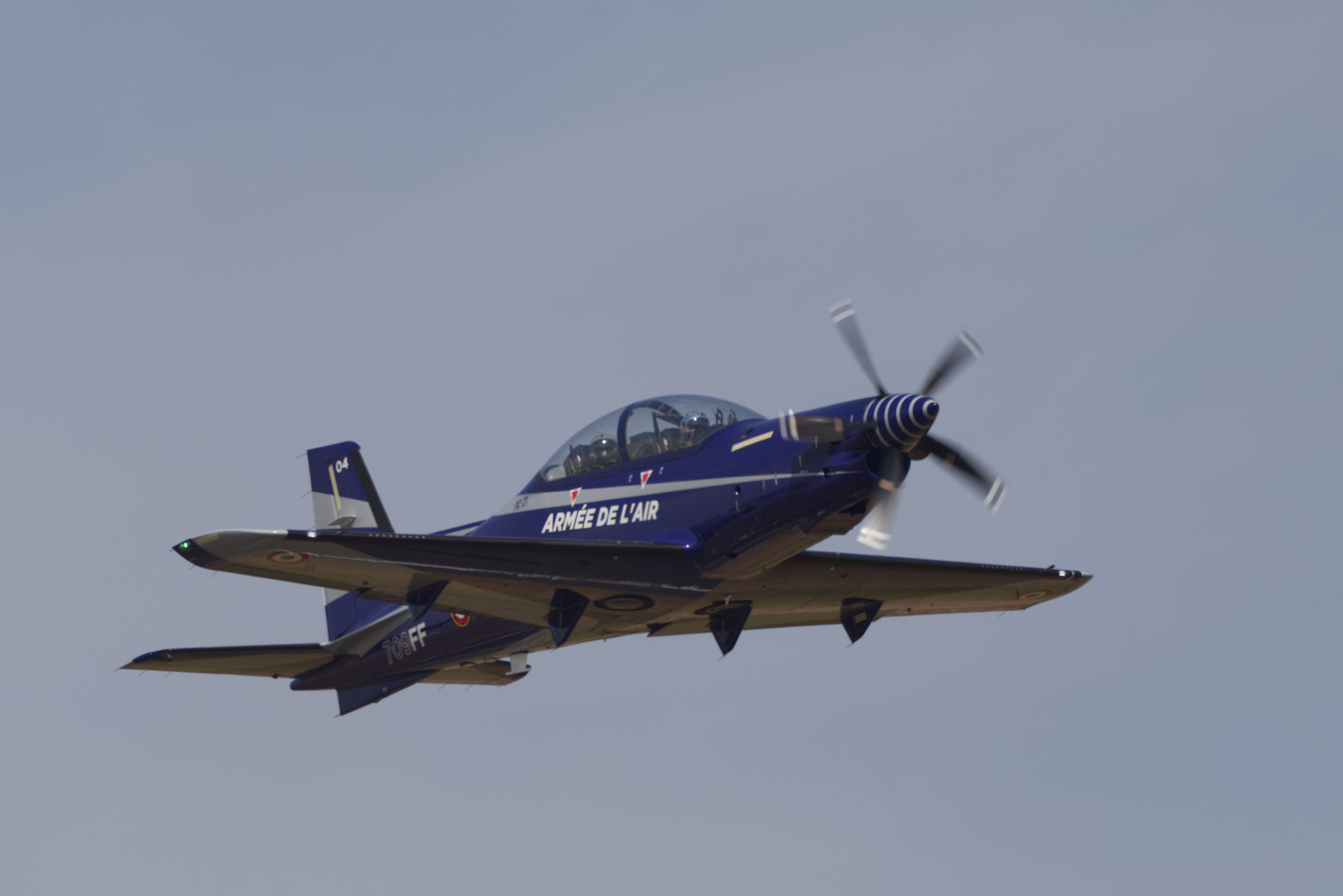
Pilatus PC-21

=== Fixed wing aircraft ===
Aircraft	Origin	Role	Variant	In service	Notes
Combat aircraft
Dassault Rafale	France	Swingrole fighter	Rafale B / C	113 (+42 on order)	Tranche 5: 42 ordered to the F4 standard ordered. Fleet being modernised to the standard F4. All the Rafale are at the standard F3, F3-R, F4.1 and F4.2.
Dassault Mirage 2000	France	Multirole fighter	Mirage 2000-5F	22	Planned to be retired around 2030, and be replaced by the Rafale on order.
Dassault Mirage 2000	France	Fighter bomber	Mirage 2000D - RMV	50	Of the 52 Mirage 2000D, 50 were modernised to the standard RMV (mid-life upgrade) by June 2026.
Dassault Mirage 2000	France	Fighter bomber	Mirage 2000D	2	Of the 52 Mirage 2000D, 50 were modernised to the standard RMV (mid-life upgrade) by June 2026.
Military transport aircraft
Airbus A400M	Spain, France, Germany, United Kingdom, Belgium, Turkey	Strategic airlifter / tactical airlifter	–	20 (+25 on order)	25 A400M, 5 of which have a refuelling capacity (and are listed in the tankers).
Lockheed C-130 Hercules	United States	Tactical airlifter	C-130H-30	12	Of the 12 aircraft, 3 were upgraded. The aircraft entered service in 1987. France is planning to retire the C-130H in the near future. The successor is expected to be the FMTC.
Lockheed Martin C-130 Super Hercules	United States	Tactical airlifter	C-130J-30	2	
CASA CN235	Spain	Tactical airlifter	CN-235-200	19	19 CN-235-200 entered service in 1990. 8 CN-235-300 ordered in 2010. Modernisation of the avionic of the 27 CN235 started in 2023. The successor is expected to be the FMTC.
CASA CN235	Spain	Tactical airlifter	CN-235-300	8	19 CN-235-200 entered service in 1990. 8 CN-235-300 ordered in 2010. Modernisation of the avionic of the 27 CN235 started in 2023. The successor is expected to be the FMTC.
VIP transport and liaison aircraft
Airbus A330	France; Germany	Government transport	A330-200	1	Entered in service in November 2010, purchased second hand.
Dassault Falcon 900	France	Government transport	Falcon 900	2	
Dassault Falcon 900	France	Government transport	Falcon 900 EX-EASY	2	It replaced the family of Falcon 2000LX.
Dassault Falcon 7X	France	Government transport	–	2	Entered service in 2009 and 2010 respectively.
DHC-6 Twin Otter	Canada	Liaison aircraft / special forces light transport aircraft	–	5	Entered service in 1978.
Daher TBM700	France	Liaison aircraft	TBM700A	16	Entered service in 1990.
Aerial refueling
Airbus A330 MRTT Phénix	Spain; France; Germany	Tanker / command node /transporter / MEDEVAC	A330-200 MRTT	13 (+2 on order)	Framework contract signed in 2014 for up to 12 A330 MRTT: FW Batch 1: November 2014, 1 × A330 MRTT; FW Batch 2: December 2015, 8 × A330 MRTT; FW Batch 3: December 2018, 3 × A330 MRTT; August 2020, 3 × A330 MRTT (1 new build, 2 second hand); Refuelling equipment: 1 × ARBS refuelling boom; 2 × Cobham 905E underwing pods; Internal capabilities: C2 and relay node (MELISSA SatCom with Syracuse IV satellites); Passenger transport: 272 passengers; 2 × MEDEVAC: "MORPHEE" kits with up to 10 ICU patients and 88 passengers
Airbus A400M	United Kingdom	Aerial refueling / tactical airlifter / strategic airlifter	A400M MRTT	5	Five refuelling kit for the A400M purchased, they refuel aircraft and helicopters. The refuelling pods are the Cobham 908E WDE, which are placed under the wing and have the capability to refuel helicopters.
Lockheed Martin KC-130 Super Hercules	United States	Aerial refueling / tactical airlifter	KC-130J	2	It entered service in 2019.
Special role aircraft
Boeing E-3 Sentry	United States	AWACS	E-3F	4	It entered service in May 1991.
Saab GlobalEye	Sweden; Canada	AEW&C	Global 6500 - GlobalEye	0 (+2 on order)	2 ordered in December 2025, with an option for 2 more aircraft. The delivery is planned for 2029 - 2032. Successor of the E-3 Sentry.
Dassault Archange	France	SIGINT	Falcon 8X Archange	0 (+2 on order)	Two ordered in 2019, a minimum of three aircraft planned.
Beechcraft King Air 350ER	United States; Belgium; France	ISR	ALSR Vador	2 (+1 on order)	8 aircraft were planned with the LPM 2019 - 2025, but only 3 were ordered. The third is planned to be deployed in Djibouti.
Demonstration aircraft
Alpha Jet (Dassault / Dornier)	France; Germany	Aerobatic display	Alpha Jet E	12	Aircraft used by the Patrouille de France since 1981.
Extra 330	Germany	Aerobatic display	–	3	Aircraft operated by the "Équipe de voltige de l'Armée de l'Air et de l'Espace" since 2005.
Trainer aircraft
Dassault Mirage 2000	France	Operational conversion aircraft	Mirage 2000-5F-SF2	6	It entered service in 1993, 7 remain in service.
Alpha Jet (Dassault / Dornier)	France; Germany	Aggressor / JTAC training	Alpha Jet E	31	The advanced training mission was transferred entirely to the Pilatus PC-21. The training role of the Alpha Jet is exclusively focuses on the "Red Air" force (OPFOR / aggressor) to train air-to-air combat, and JTAC training.
Pilatus PC-21	Switzerland	Advanced trainer / Lead-in fighter training	–	26	Purchased as part of the MENTOR 1 programme (replacement of Alpha Jet and the Epsilon): Dec. 2016: 17 PC-21; Jul. 2021: 9 PC-21The aircrafr entered service in 2018. (It has a secondary role as surveillance aircraft.)
Pilatus PC-7	Switzerland	Basic trainer / ab initio trainer	PC-7 MKX	0 (+22 on order)	Contract signed in January 2025 with Babcock to provide 22 aircraft, as art of the MENTOR 2 programme (replacement of the Cirrus SR20 and Grob 120). The contract is signed for 17 years. 12 simulators for this aircraft (provided by Exail) to be positionned at the Salon-de-Provence Air Base.
Embraer EMB 121 Xingu	Brazil	Multi-engine trainer / Liaison	–	16	It is used to train transport pilots. It is used in a secondary role as a liaison aircraft.
Grob G120	Germany	Ab initio trainer	G120A-F	17	Fleet outsourced to the Airbus Flight Academy (G120 after SR20 / SR22 in the training curriculum). Being replaced by the PC-7 MKX.
Cirrus SR20	United States	Ab initio trainer	–	21	Fleet outsourced to the Airbus Flight Academy. Being replaced by the PC-7 MKX.
Cirrus SR22	United States	Ab initio trainer	–	10	Fleet outsourced to the Airbus Flight Academy. Being replaced by the PC-7 MKX.

=== Helicopters ===
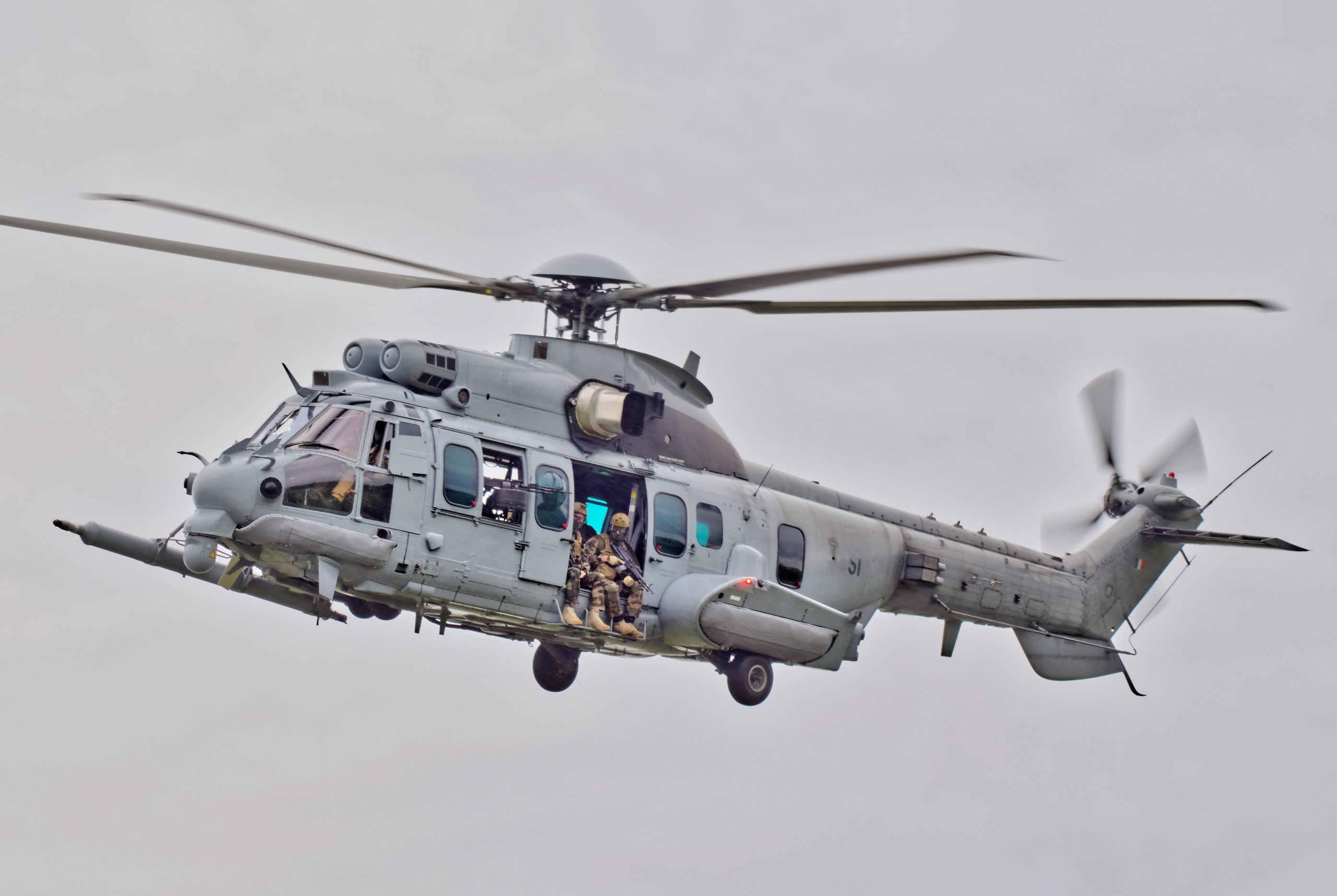
Airbus H225M Caracal

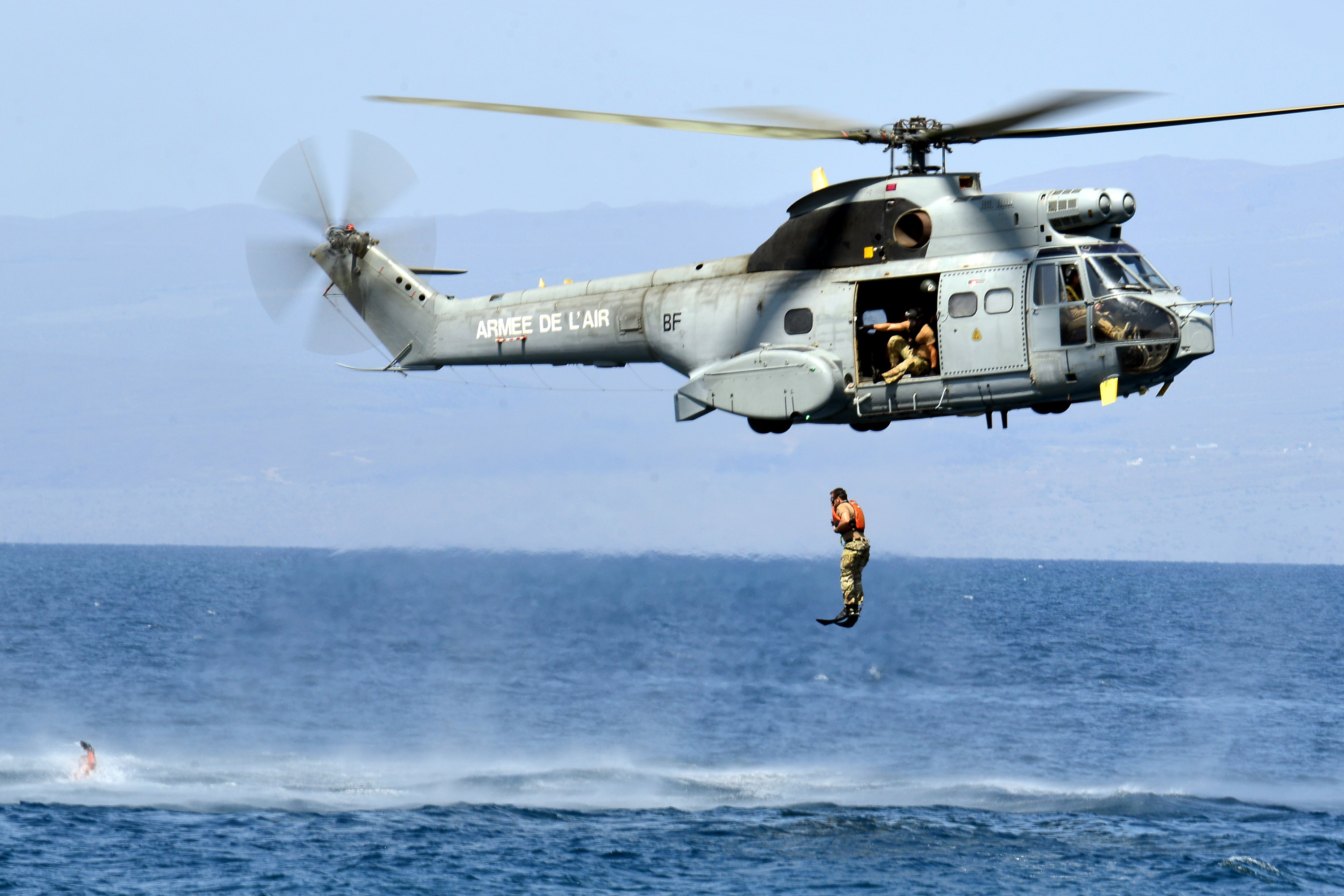
Sud-Aviation SA330 Puma

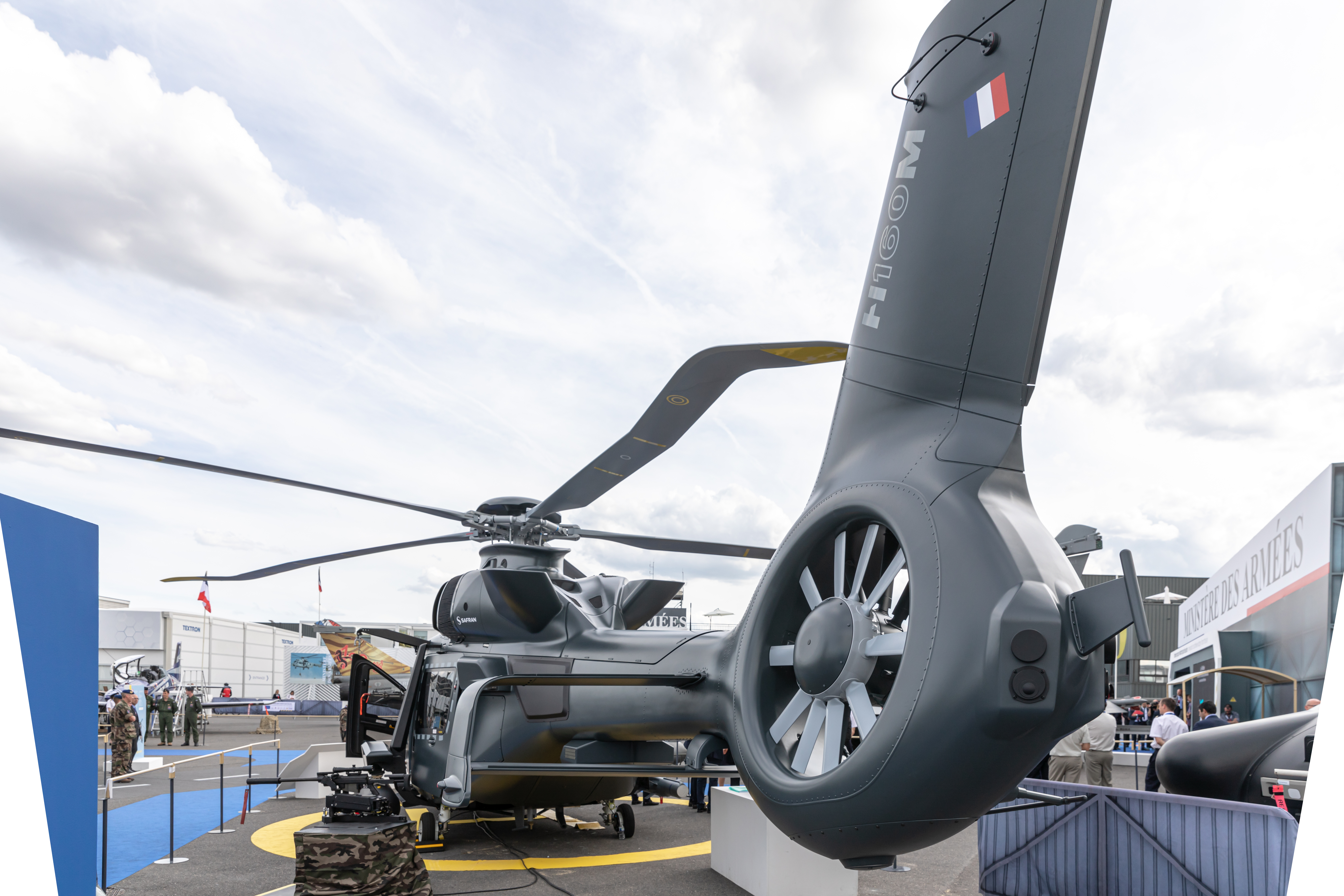
Airbus Helicopters H160M -Guépard

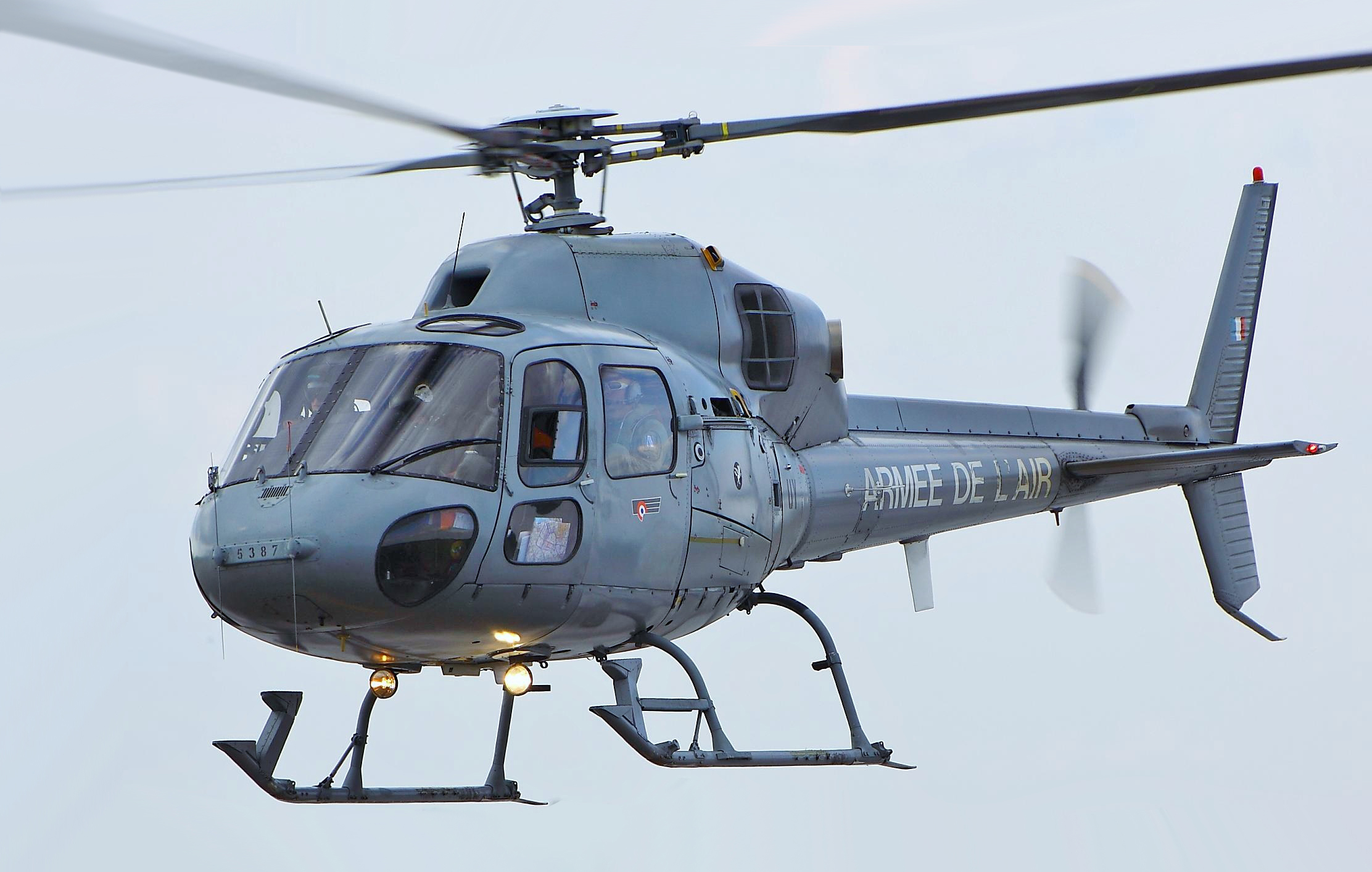
Eurocopter AS555 Fennec

Aircraft	Origin	Role	Variant	In service	Notes
Medium military helicopters
Airbus Helicopters H225M Caracal	France	CSAR / tactical transport / MEDEVAC	–	11	Orders: Early years 2000: 6 × H225M for the CSAR mission, delivered between February 2005 and May 2007; April 2009: 5 × H225M ordered
Airbus Helicopters H225M Caracal	France	Medium utility / SAR	–	8	8 H225M Caracal ordered in April 2021 to replace the SA330 Puma. The first delivery took place in January 2025, and the last was delivered in June 2026.
Airbus Helicopters H225M Caracal	France	Special forces helicopter	H225FS	0 (+ 8 to be transferred from the ALAT)	8 helicopters to be transferred from the 4th Special Forces Helicopter Regiment of the French Army Light Aviation once they receive the new NH90 FS. These 8 helicopters are equipped with a refuelling pole.
Eurocopter EC225 Super Puma Mk2	France	SAR	EC225LP	2	Transferred from the French Navy to the 1/67 Pyrénées Squadron as the French Navy introduced the NH90 Caïnman Marine for this mission.
Sud-Aviation SA330 Puma	France	Medium utility / SAR	SA.330H	15	It entered service in 1974. It is being replaced by the Caracal.
Light military helicopters
Airbus Helicopters H160M -Guépard	France	MASA / SAR / ISR	–	0 (+40 on order)	169 H160M ordered by the French Armed Forces, among which, 40 for the French Air and Space Force. In the Air Force, it will replace the Eurocopter AS555 Fennec 2.
Eurocopter AS555 Fennec	France	MASA / SAR / MEDEVAC	–	40	It entered service in 1990. To be replaced by the Airbus Helicopters H160M -Guépard.
VIP transport
Aerospatiale AS332 Super Puma (Airbus H215)	France	VIP transport	–	3	It entered service in 1984 as a government transport helicopter. The helicopters are being replaced by the Caracal.

=== Unmanned aerial vehicles ===
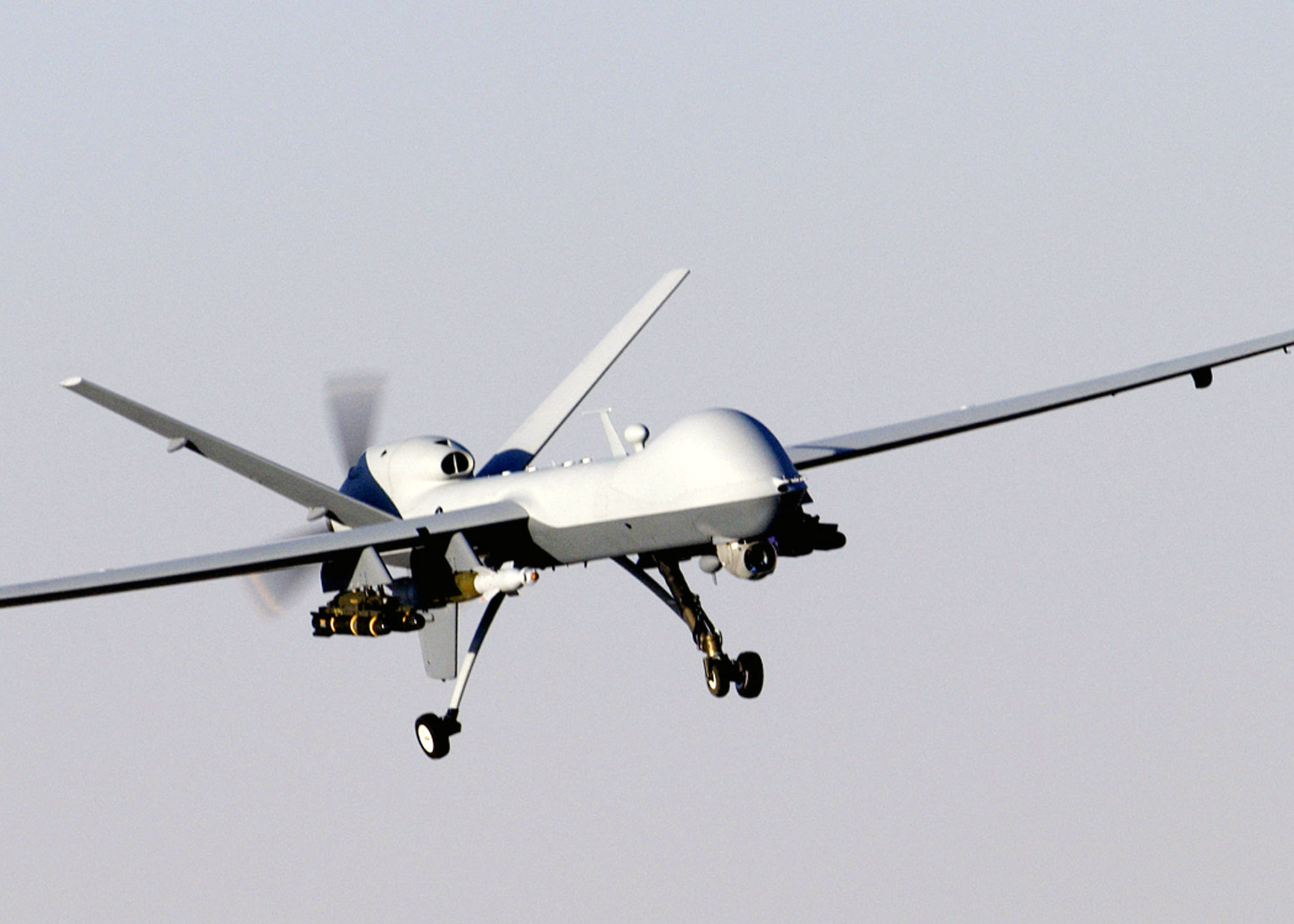
General Atomics MQ-9 Reaper

Aircraft	Origin	Role	Variant	In service	Notes
Combat drones
General Atomics MQ-9 Reaper	United States	MALE; UCAV / ISTAR	MQ-9 block 5 ER	12	In service since 2013, with multiple orders placed, totalling 4 systems (each with 3 drones).
Eurodrone	Germany; France; Italy; Spain	MALE; UCAV / ISTAR	–	0 (+12 on order)	The contract was signed in February 2022. It includes 4 systems, each with 3 drones, and it was ordered with multiple other nations.

=== Spatial equipment ===
==== Satellites ====
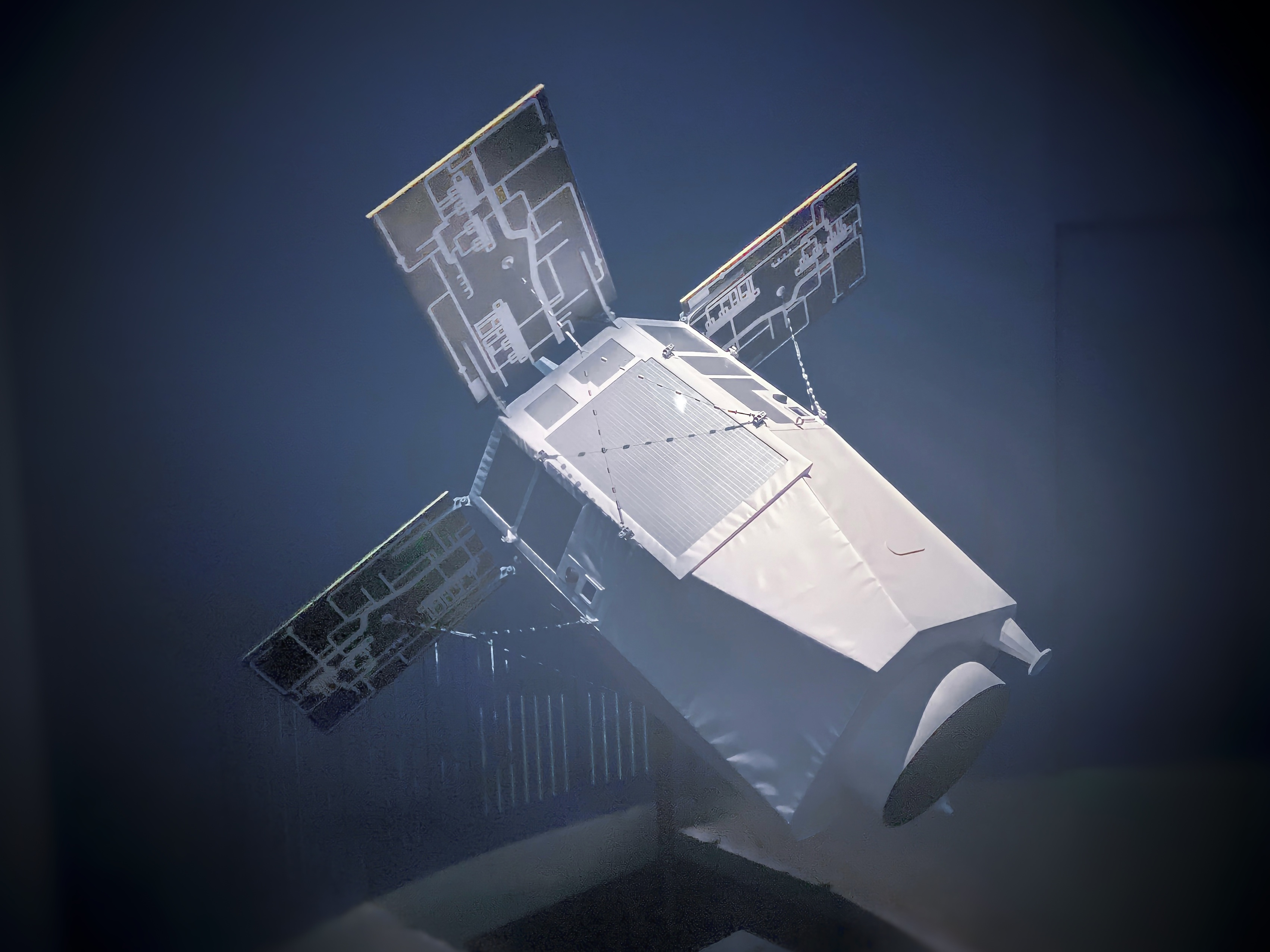
CSO satellite (mock-up)

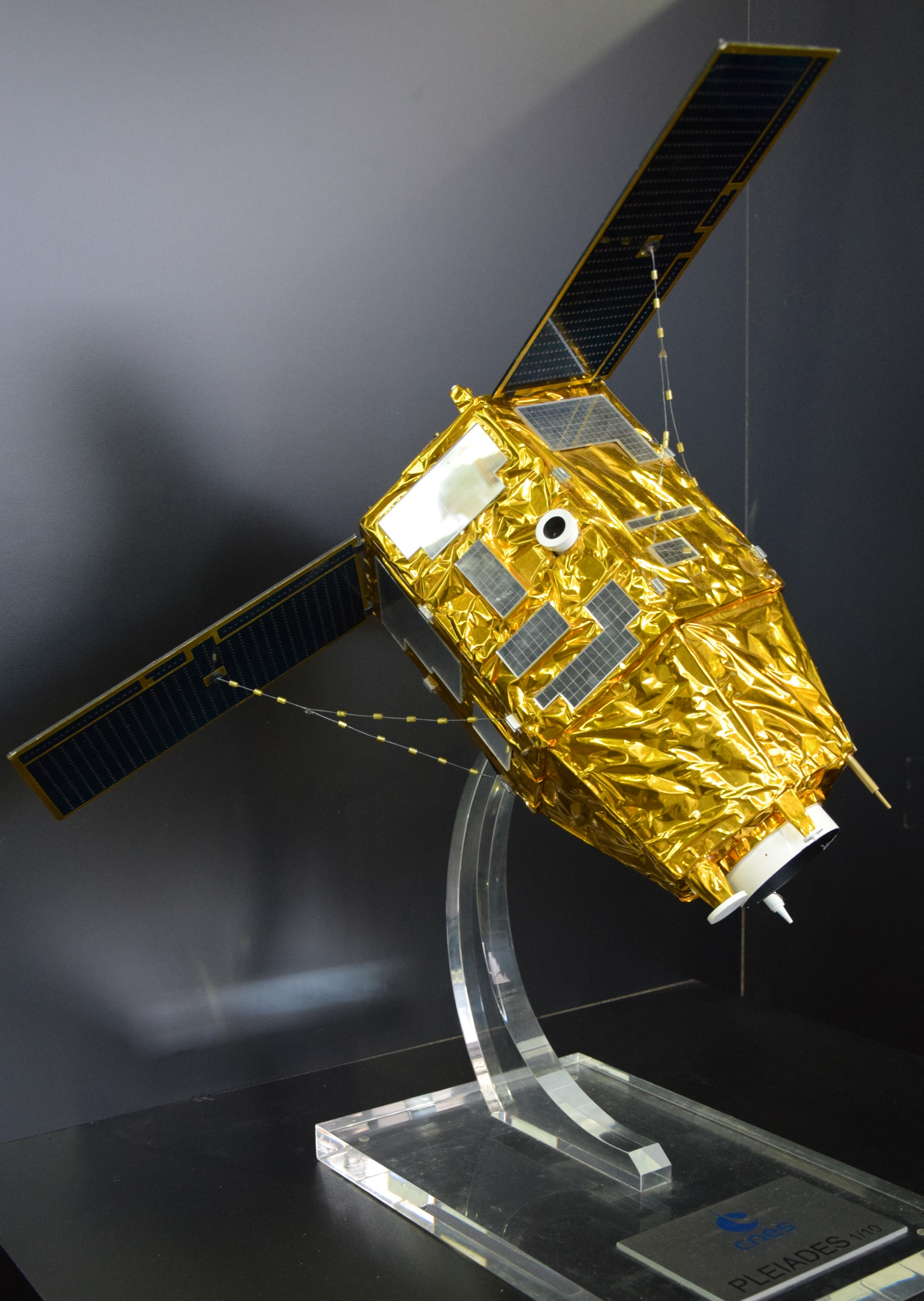
Pléiades satellite (mock-up)

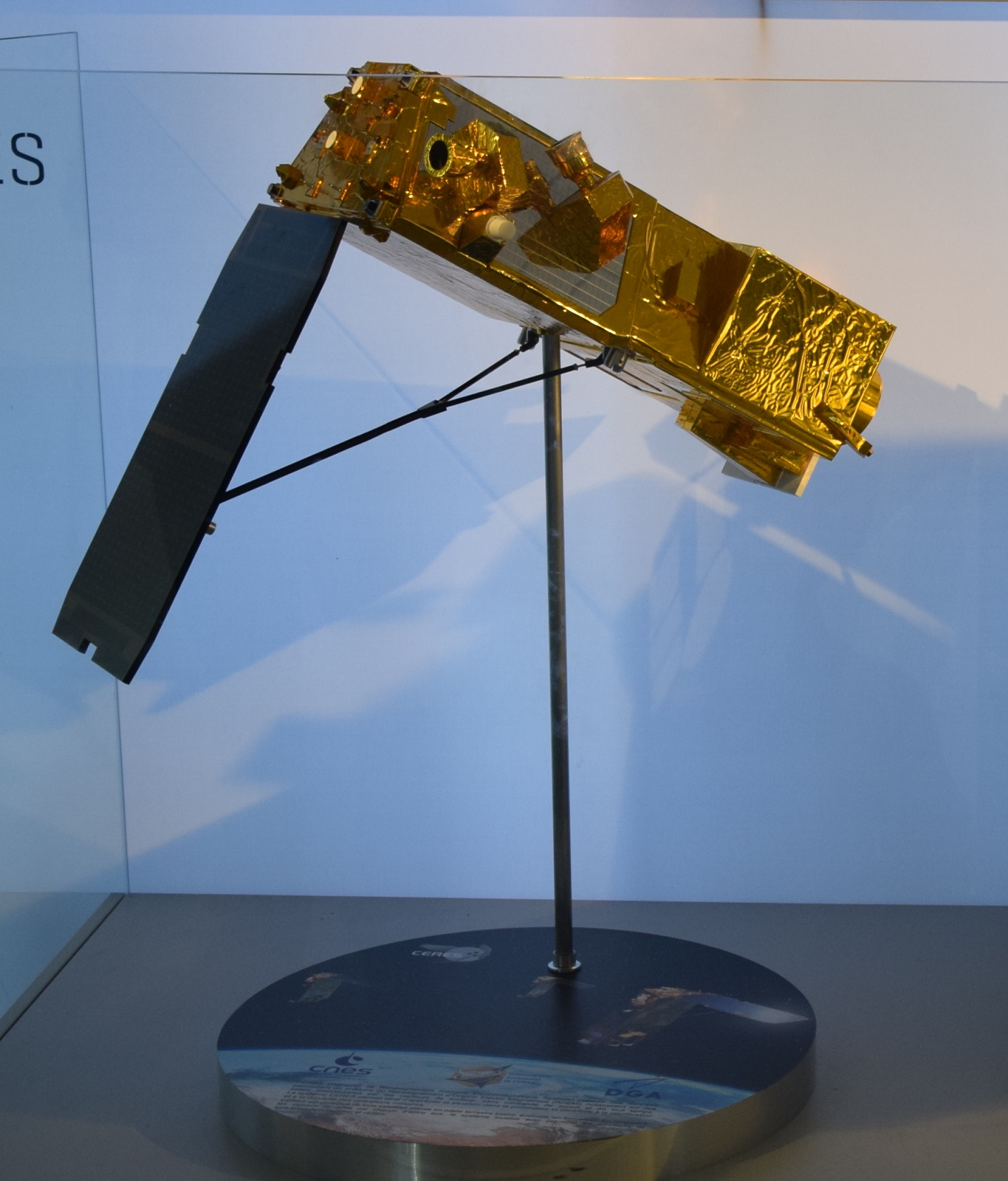
CERES satellite (mock-up)

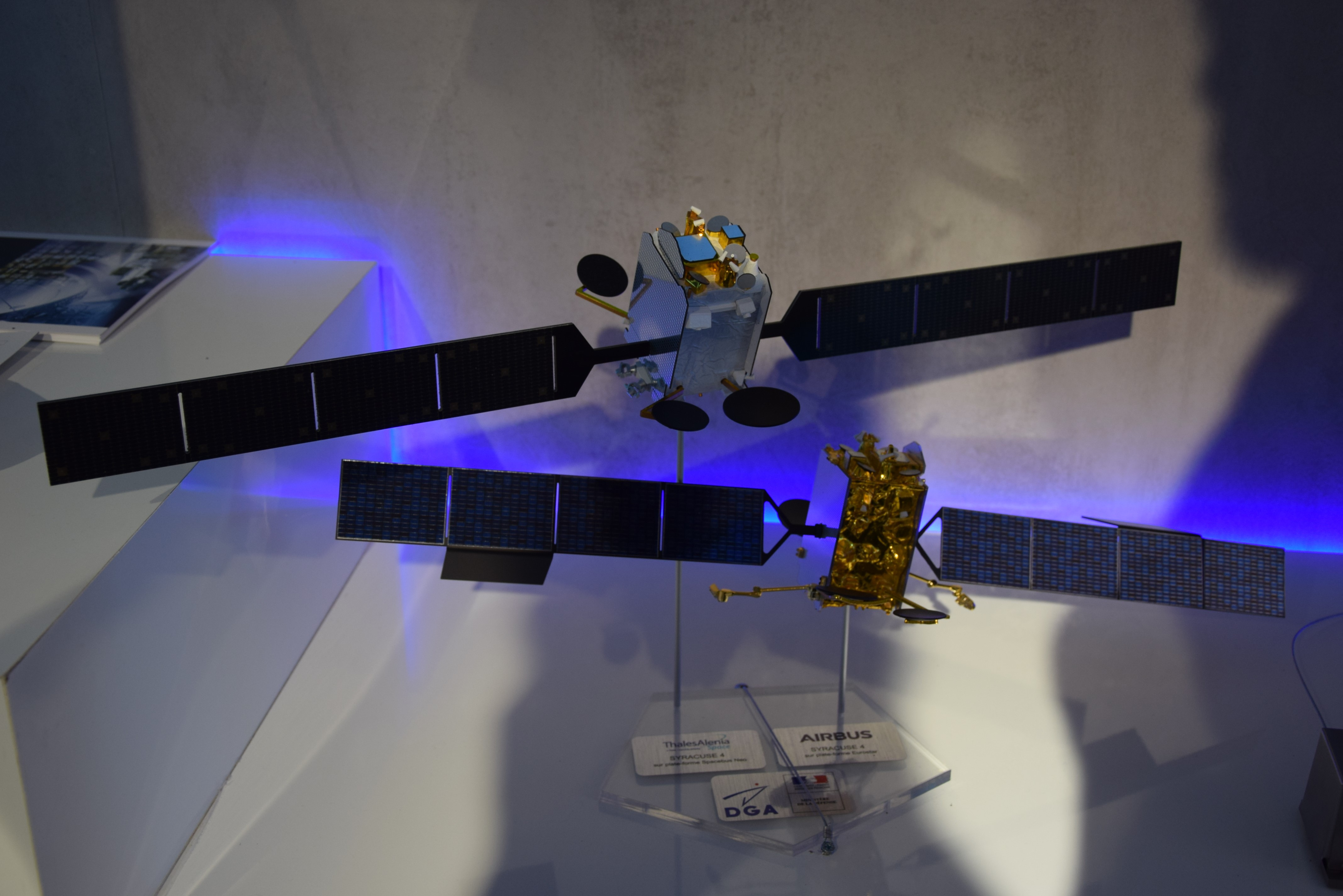
Syracuse IV satellites (mock-up)

Model	Origin	Role	Variant	In service	Notes
Patrol satellites
Toutatis programme U-Space	France	LEO, nano-satellite, observation	Lisa-1	0 (+1 planned)	Observation satellite, and a patrol satellite designed to protect the assets in space, research programme.
Toutatis programme U-Space	France	LEO, Maneuverable, hunting satellite	Splinter	0 (+1 planned)	Observation satellite, and a patrol satellite designed to protect the assets in space, research programme.
Optical observation satellites
CSO; Airbus Defence and Space / Thales Alenia Space	France	SSO earth observation satellite	–	3	The satellites were launched in: CSO-1: December 2018; CSO-2, December 2020; CSO-3, March 2025Note: France shares data with 8 countries: Germany (2015), Sweden (2015), Belgium (2017), Italy (2019), Spain (2021), Switzerland (2023), Poland (2024) and Greece (2024).
Optical observation (data purchase)
Pléiades Neo; Airbus Defence and Space	France	SSO near polar orbit, earth observation satellite	–	2	The satellites were launched in: Pléiades Neo 3, April 2021 (Vega - Zefiro 23 upper stage); Pléiades Neo 4, August 2021 (Vega - Zefiro 23 upper stage)Note: Pléiades Neo 5 and 6 were lost during the launch (Vega C flight VV22). The constellation belongs to Airbus Defence and Space, and the French Air and Space Force has access to the data.
Pléaides; Airbus Defence and Space	France	SSO near polar orbit, earth observation satellite	–	2	The satellites were launched in: Pléiades 1A, December 2011 (Soyuz ST-A - Fregat upper stage); Pléiades 1B, December 2012 (Soyuz ST-A- Fregat upper stage)The constellation is exploited by Airbus Defence and Space and the CNES, the French Air and Space Force has access to the data. Their use was extended until 2028.
Radar observation (data purchase)
SAR-Lupe; OHB-System	Germany	LEO near polar orbit, SAR earth observation satellite	–	5	The satellites were launched in: SAR-Lupe-1, December 2006; SAR-Lupe-2, July 2007; SAR-Lupe-3, November 2007; SAR-Lupe-4, March 2008; SAR-Lupe-5, July 2008
Electronic intelligence
CERES; Airbus Defence and Space / Thales Alenia Space	France	LEO, SIGINT	–	3	The satellites were launched in November 2021.
CELESTE programme Airbus Defence and Space / Thales Alenia Space	France	SIGINT	–	0 (+11 planned)	Planned successor of the CERES satellites to enter service in 2030.
Military communication satellites
Syracuse IV; Airbus Defence and Space / Thales Alenia Space / Telespazio / Safran	France	GEO, military telecommunication satellites	–	2	The satellites in service were launched in: Syracuse 4A, October 2021; Syracuse 4B, July 2023Note Syracuse 4C cancelled (2 satellites sufficient coverage). Syracuse IV SatCom stations supplied by Thales.
Syracuse III; Alcatel Alenia Space	France	GEO, military telecommunication satellites	–	2	The satellites in service were launched in: Syracuse 3A, October 2005 (Ariane 5); Syracuse 3B, August 2006 (Ariane 5)
Sicral 2 Thales Alenia Space	France; Italy	GEO, military telecommunication satellites	–	1	The satellite in service was launched in April 2015. Used by France and Italy.
Athena-Fidus; Thales Alenia Space	France; Italy	GEO, military telecommunication satellites	–	1	The satellite in service was launched in February 2014. Used by France, Belgium and Italy.
Civilian communication satellites (contracts)
Eutelsat	France	Telecommunication satellites	–	31	CENTAURE contract signed in June 2026 to use the Eutelsat communications capabilities. Intermediate solution while waiting for the IRIS² introduction.
IRIS²; OHB	Germany	–	–	0 (+18 on order)	Multi-orbit secure connectivity constellation. 18 satellites ordered in 2026.
Navigation satellites
Galileo	Europe	MEO, Global navigation satellite system	IOV	3	Out of four Galileo IOV that were launched, three remain in service. The satellites in service were launched in: IOV FM1, October 2011 (Soyuz ST-B - Fregat-MT upper stage); IOV FM2, October 2011 (Soyuz ST-B - Fregat-MT upper stage); IOV FM3, October 2012 (Soyuz ST-B - Fregat-MT upper stage)
Galileo	Europe	MEO, Global navigation satellite system	FOC	25 (+4 on order)	Out of thirty Galileo IOV that were launched, three are unusable, 1 was retired. The satellites in service were launched in: FOC FM3, October 2012 (Soyuz ST-B - Fregat-MT upper stage); FOC FM6, (Soyuz ST-B - Fregat-MT upper stage); FOC FM8, December 2015 (Soyuz ST-B - Fregat-MT upper stage); FOC FM9, December 2015 (Soyuz ST-B - Fregat-MT upper stage); FOC FM11, May 2016 (Soyuz ST-B - Fregat-MT upper stage); FOC FM7, November 2016 (Ariane 5 ES); FOC FM12, November 2016 (Ariane 5 ES); FOC FM13, November 2016 (Ariane 5 ES); FOC FM14, November 2016 (Ariane 5 ES); FOC FM15, December 2017 (Ariane 5 ES); FOC FM16, December 2017 (Ariane 5 ES); FOC FM17, December 2017 (Ariane 5 ES); FOC FM18, December 2017 (Ariane 5 ES); FOC FM19, July 2018 (Ariane 5 ES); FOC FM20, July 2018 (Ariane 5 ES); FOC FM21, July 2018 (Ariane 5 ES); FOC FM22, July 2018 (Ariane 5 ES); FOC FM23, December 2021 (Soyuz ST-B - Fregat-MT upper stage); FOC FM24, December 2021 (Soyuz ST-B - Fregat-MT upper stage); FOC FM25, April 2024 (Falcon 9 Block 5); FOC FM27, April 2024 (Falcon 9 Block 5); FOC FM26, September 2024 (Falcon 9 Block 5); FOC FM32, September 2024 (Falcon 9 Block 5); FOC FM33, December 2025 (Ariane 62); FOC FM34, December 2025 (Ariane 62)Planned launches: FOC FM29, Q4 2026 (Ariane 62); FOC FM30, Q4 2026 (Ariane 62); FOC FM28, Q1 2027 (Ariane 62); FOC FM31, Q1 2027 (Ariane 62)
Galileo	Europe	MEO, Global navigation satellite system	G2G	0 (+6 on order)	Satellites on order: G2G.1, Q4 2026 (Ariane 62 block2); G2G.2, Q4 2026 (Ariane 62 block2); G2G.3, Q1 2027 (Ariane 62 block2); G2G.4, Q1 2027 (Ariane 62 block2); G2G.5, 2027; G2G.6, 2027

==== Spatial surveillance ====
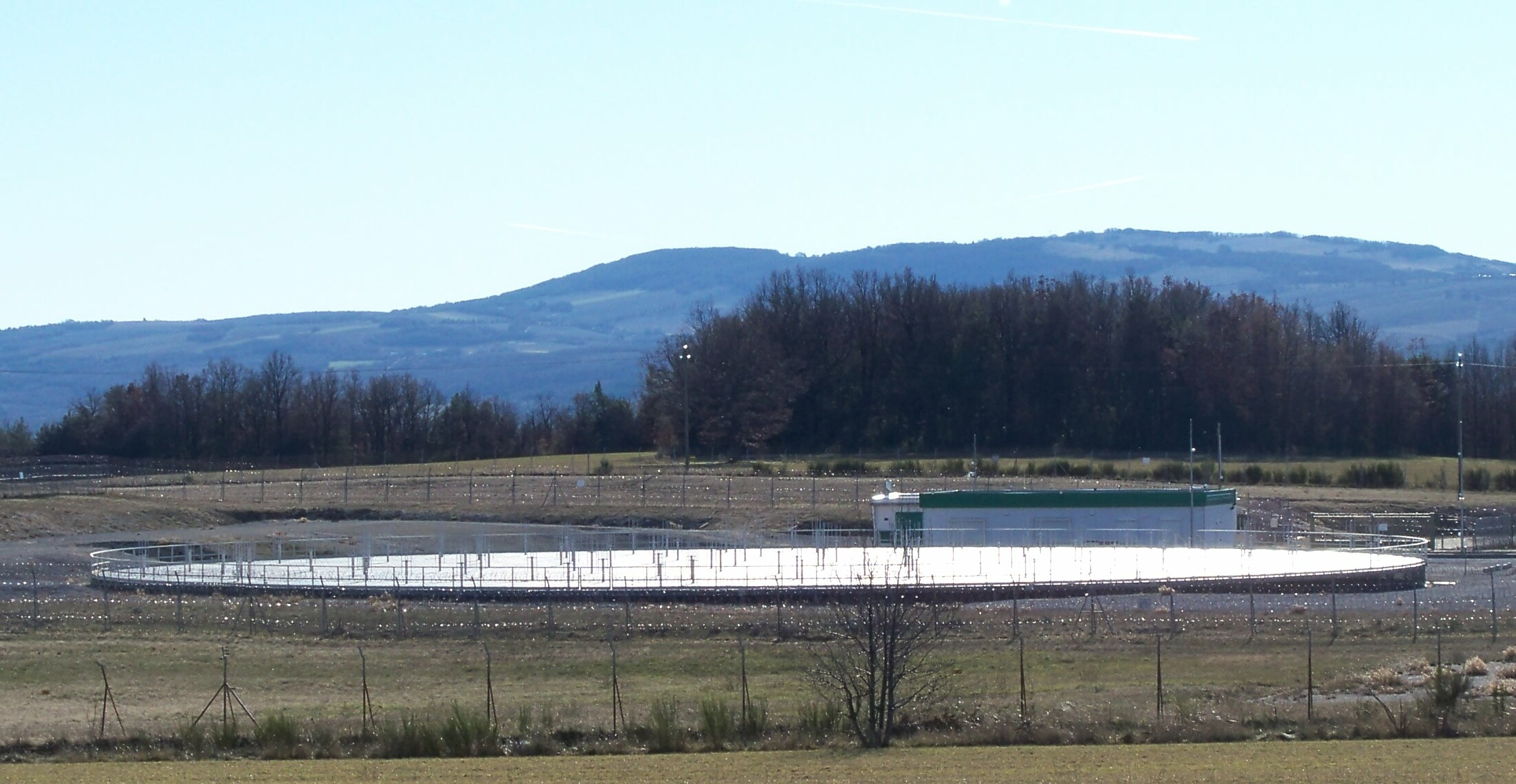
GRAVES

Model	Origin	Role	Variant	In service	Notes
Space surveillance
GRAVES	France	Bistatic doppler radar, space surveillance system	–	1	
SATAM	France	Trajectory radar	–	3	

=== Air defence ===
==== Air defence systems ====
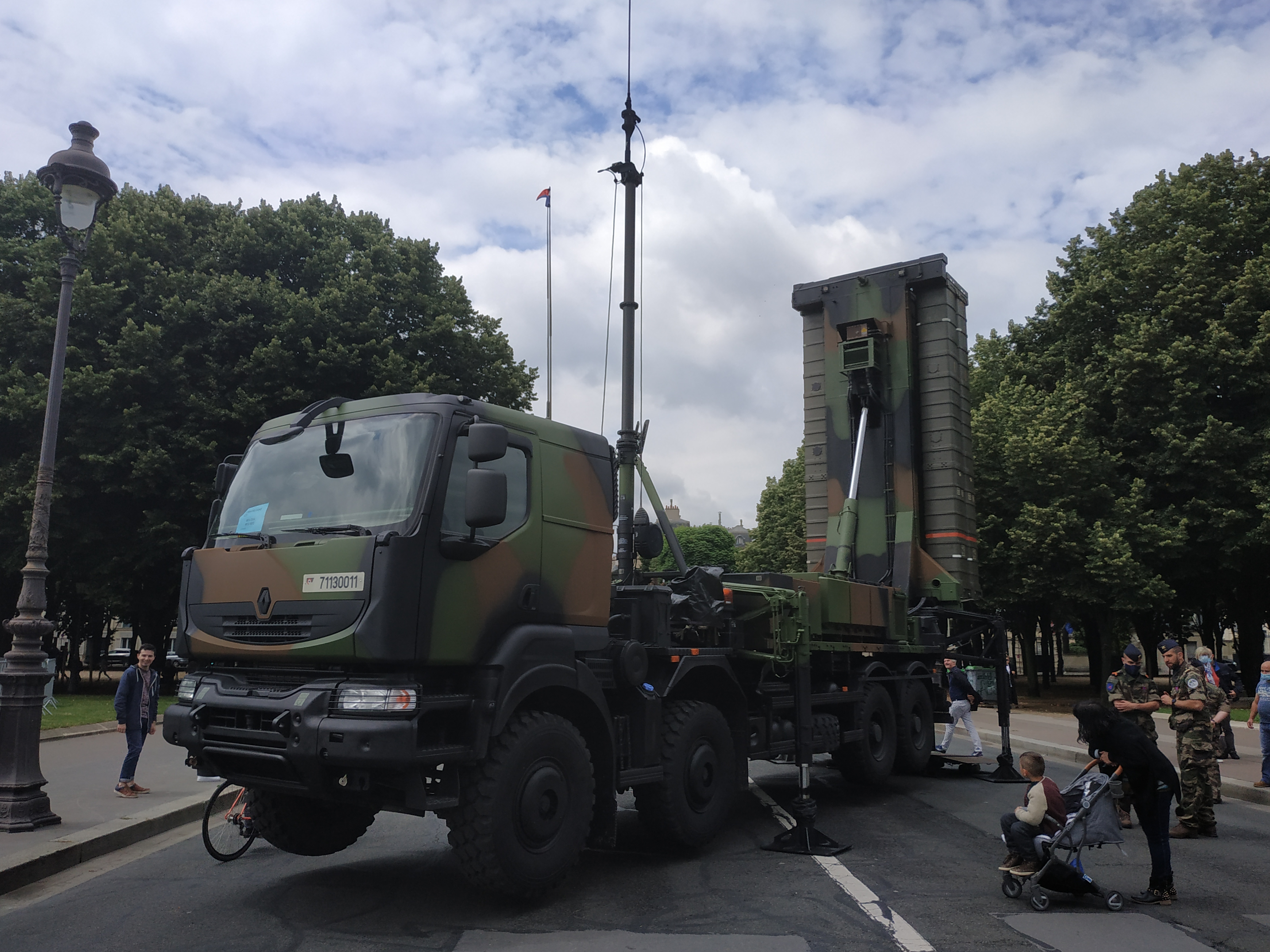
SAMP/T launch module

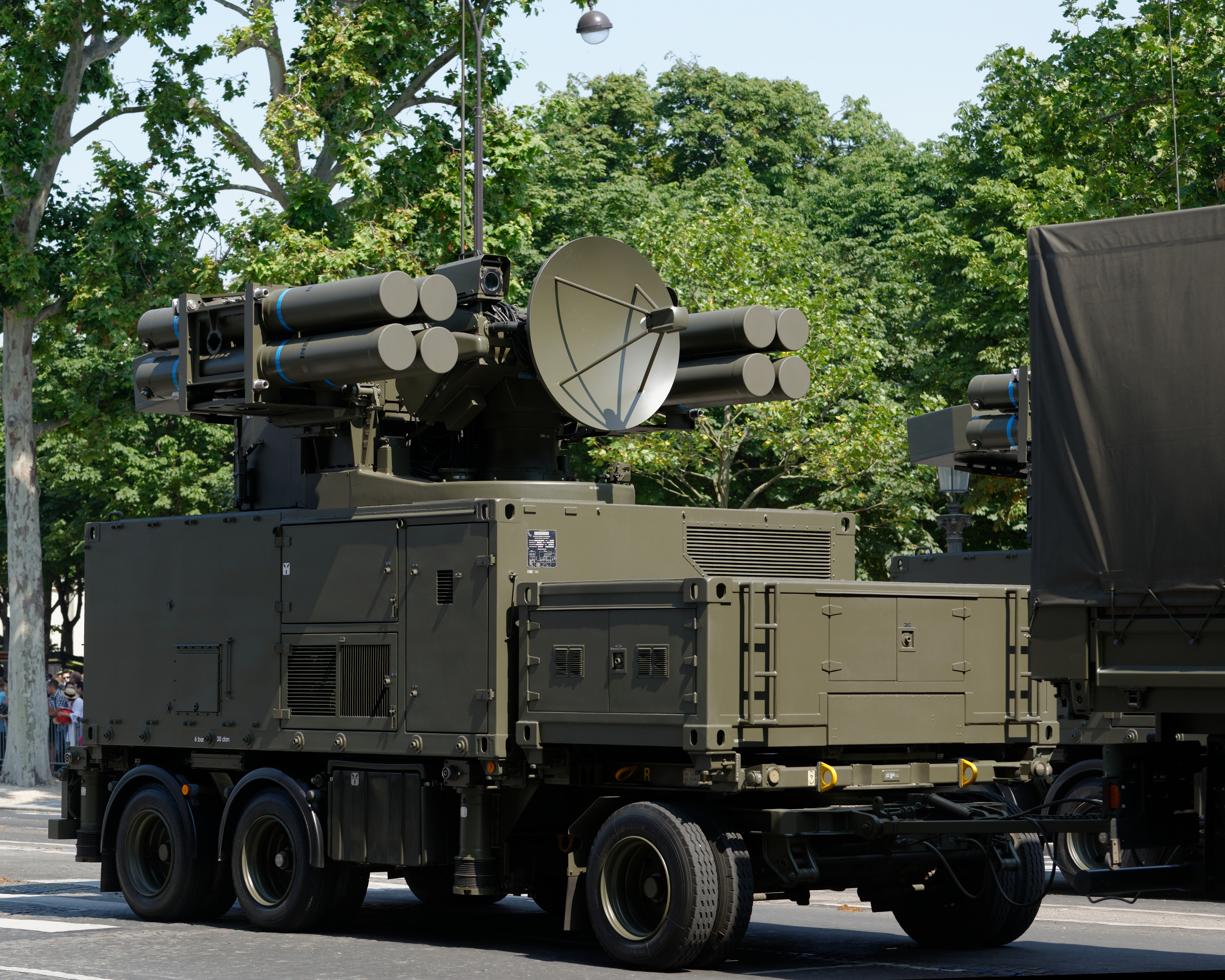
Crotale NG

Model	Origin	Type	Variant	In service	Notes
Air defence missile systems
SAMP/T Mamba; Eurosam	France; Italy	Medium to long range air defence system	SAMP/T	8	Entered service in 2011, 8 in service. Fire unit consists of: Command module: 1 × for 2 fire units; Engagement module: 1 × ME; Radar identification module: 1 × Thales Arabel (3D, PESA radar); Electric generator: 1 × MGE; Launchers: 4 × launchers (Aster 30); Reloading: reloading truck; Weapons: 8 × per launcher; Aster 30; Aster 30B1NT; Vehicles: Trucks: Renault Kerax 460.32 dXi 8×4; Reconnaissance: 8 × Land Rover Defender; Direct support unit: 1 × SAE (Shelter Atelier Electronique); 1 × electronic parts shelter; 1 × SAM (Shelter Atelier Mécanique); 1 × mechanic parts shelter
SAMP/T Mamba; Eurosam	France; Italy	Multi-layer medium to long range air defence system	SAMP/T NG	0 (+8 on order)	Eight fire units ordered in June 2026 by the OCCAR to Eurosam. Fire unit consists of: Radar identification module: 1 × Ground Fire 300; Engagement module: 1 × ME-NG; Electric generator: 1 × MGE-NG; Launchers: up to 8 × launchers; Aster 30 launchers; MICA VL launchers; Weapons: Aster 30: Aster 30B1; Aster 30B1NT; MICA VL: MICA VL IR; MICA VL EM; MICA VL NG IR; MICA VL NG EM; Direct support unit: Missile reloading; Electronic Workshop Shelter; Mechanical Workshop Shelter; Spare-parts Warehouse Shelter
Thales Crotale	France; United States	Short range air defence system	Crotale NG	7	It remains in service as of 2026. The missiles used with this variant are the American VT-1. The system is a trailer equipped with a radar system and 8 × missiles ready to be fired. Planned to be replaced by MICA NG fire units.
MICA VL	France	Short range air defence system	–	2	Fire unit consists of: Radar identification module: 1 × Thales Ground Master 200; Engagement module: 1 × MBDA Tactical Operations Centre (TOC); Launch modules: 3 to 6 × launch vehicles with 8 × missiles; Missiles: MICA VL IR; MICA VL EM; Vehicles: Mercedes-Benz Zetros
Anti-drone systems
PARADE; Thales / CS Group	France	Drone countermeasures system	–	–	6 systems to be delivered to the French Armed Forces in 2023 (the number of systems going to the Air and Space Force is unknown). 15 systems planned in total, with full delivery to be completed by 2030.
NEROD F5; MC2 Technologies	France	Man-portable anti-drone jamming system	–	–	The NEROD F5 is a microwave jammer capable of disrupting and neutralising all communication protocols used by drones. It neutralises radio and satellite guided UAV.

==== Surveillance systems ====
The Air and Space Force operates a wide range of air and space surveillance systems. Among them, the:

- Fixed radars:
  - 12 Ground Master 406 and 403 AESA long-range air defense 3D radars
  - 15 legacy high / medium altitude radars:
    - TRAC 2400 long-range two-dimensional electronically scanned radars
    - SATRAP 3D
    - TRS 22XX and TRS 2215 three-dimensional long-range electronically scanned radars
  - 12 legacy approach radars:
    - ALADIN NGD tactical and air-transportable low- and very-low-altitude coverage radars
    - CENTAURE primary and secondary panoramic radars
  - 2 modern approach radars:
    - 1 Indra BA2D NG
    - 1 Indra BA2D
  - 23 CM
  - ARES
- Mobile radars
  - 1 GM403T AESA long-range air defense 3D radars
  - 4 Ground Master 200 AESA medium-range air defense 3D radars
  - 4 Saab Giraffe Mobile detection and control centres (CDC)
  - Ground Master 60 C-band short-range air defense SHORAD radar

== Personnel ==
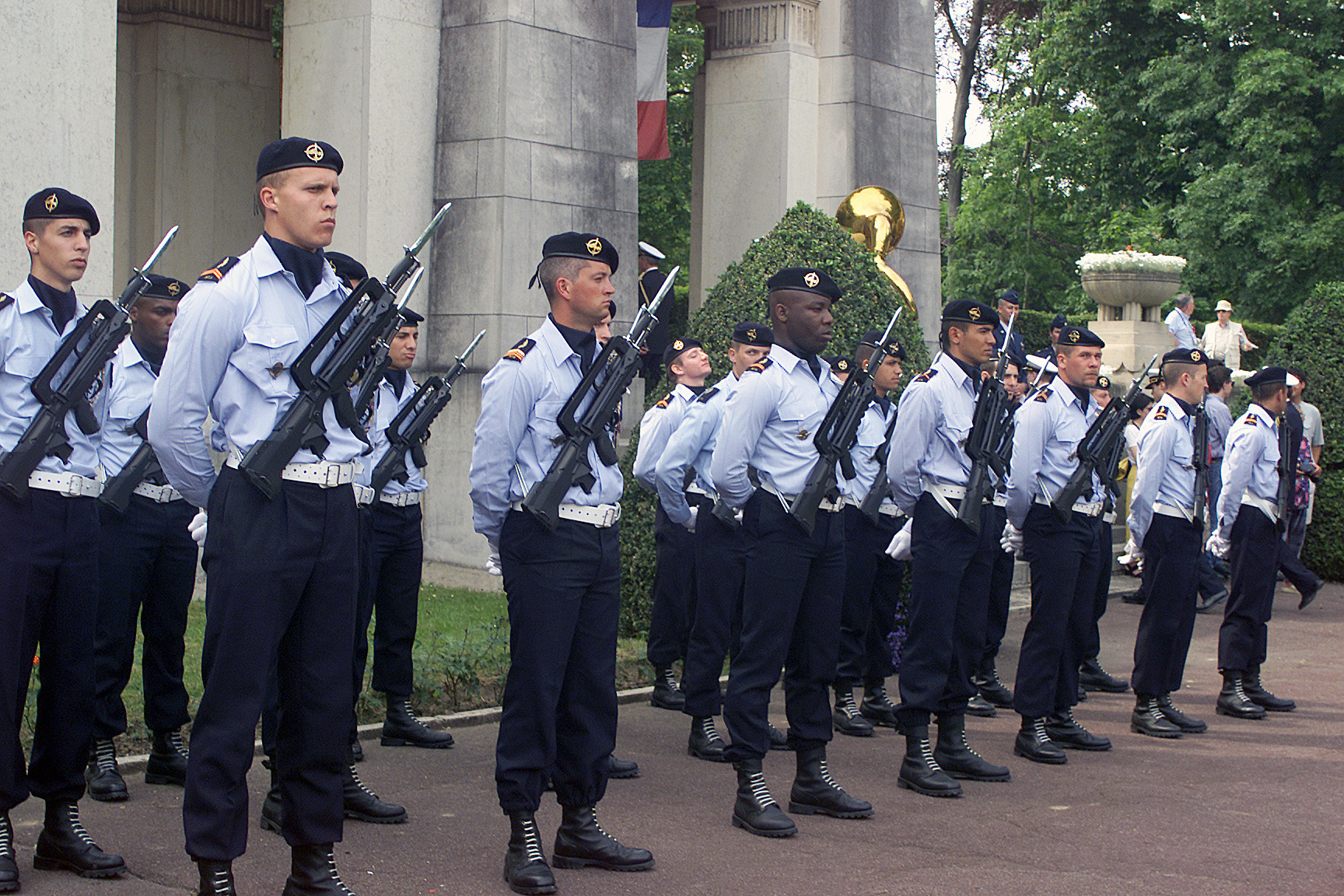
Fusiliers Commandos de l'Air at the opening of a war memorial

Since the end of the Algerian War, the French Air and Space Force has comprised about 17 to 19% of the French Armed Forces. In 1990, at the end of the Cold War, numbers reached 56,400 military personnel under contract, out of which 36,300 were part of conscription and 5,400 civilians.

In 2008, forecasts for personnel of the French Air Force were expected to number 50,000 out of which 44,000 aviators on the horizon in 2014.

In 2010, the number personnel of the French Air Force was reduced to 51,100 men and women (20%) out of which: 13% officers; 55% sous-officier; 29% air military technicians (MTA); 3% volunteers of national service and aspirant volunteers; 6,500 civilians (14%). They form several functions:

Non-flying personnel

Non-navigating personnel of the French Air and Space Force include and are not limited to : Systems Aerial Mechanics, Aerial Controllers, Meteorologists, Administrative Personnel, Air Parachute Commandos, in Informatics, in Infrastructures, in Intelligence, Commissioner of the Armies (Administrator Task).

Flying personnel

Pilots, Mechanical Navigating Officer, Navigating Arms Systems Officer (NOSA), Combat Air Medic (CVA).

=== Training of personnel ===
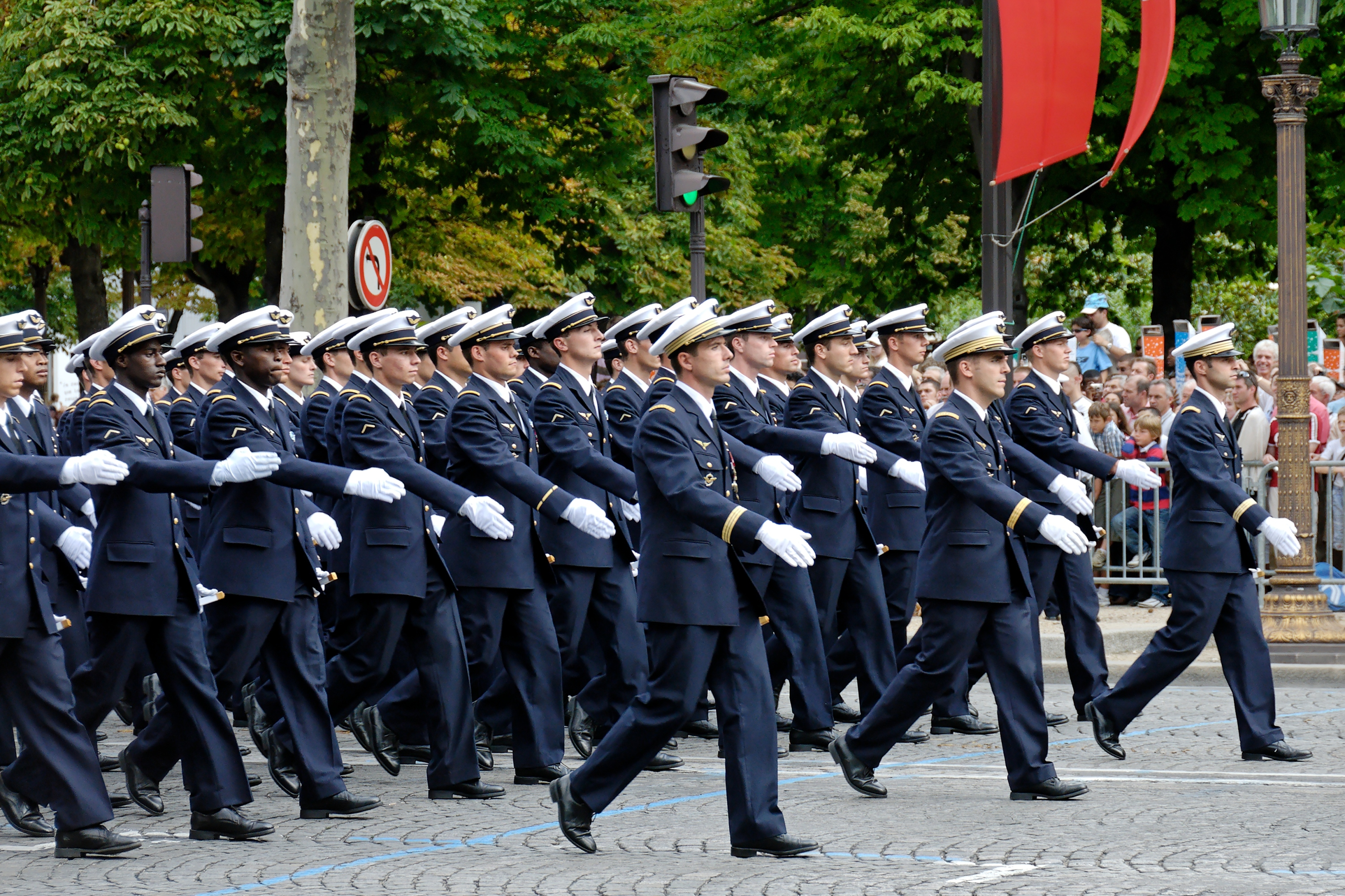
Students of the École de l'air (Air School) during the military parade of July 14th in 2007 on the Champs-Élysées

Officers, within their recruitment and future specialty, are trained at:

- École de l'air (Air School) de Provence
- École Militaire de l'Air (Military Air School)
- École des commissaires des armées (Commissioners Armies School)
- École de pilotage de l'Armée de l'air (Piloting School of the French Air and Space Force)
- École de l'aviation de transport (Aviation Transport School)
- École de l'aviation de chasse (Aviation Hunter Fighter Pilot School)
- École de transition opérationnelle (Operational Transition School)

Officers of the French Air and Space Force are spread in three corps:

- Air Officer (French: Officiers de l'air)
- Officer Mechanics (French: Officiers Mécaniciens)
- Aerial Base Officer, amongst which, officers of the Air Parachute Commandos are featured

Non-commissioned officers (Sous-Officiers) are trained at:

- École de formation des sous-officiers de l'Armée de l'air (EFSOAA) de Rochefort
- École interarmées (Inter-arm School) for administrative specialists
- Escadron de formation des commandos de l'air (EFCA) at Orange-Caritat Air Base (BA 115) for the personnel concerned

Military Air Technicians having been trained until 1 July 2015 at the Center of Elementary Military Formation (French: " Centre de formation militaire élémentaire ") of the Technical Instruction School of the French Air and Space Force of Saintes. Since 1 July 2015, training has taken place at Orange-Caritat Air Base, within the " Operational Combatant Preparation Center of the Air Force " (French: Centre de préparation opérationnelle du combattant de l'Armée de l'air).

Air traffic controllers are trained at the Center of Instruction Control and Air Defense (French: Centre d'Instruction du Contrôle et de la Défense Aérienne).

== Ranks ==
=== Commissioned officer ranks ===
The rank insignia of commissioned officers.

NATO code	OF-10	OF-9	OF-8	OF-7	OF-6	OF-5	OF-4	OF-3	OF-2	OF-1
French Air and Space Force
French Air and Space Force		Général d´armée aérienne	Général de corps aérien	Général de division aérienne	Général de brigade aérienne	Colonel	Lieutenant-colonel	Commandant	Capitaine	Lieutenant	Sous-lieutenant

Rank group	Aspirant student		Officer cadet
	Aspirant élève de l'École de l'air	Aspirant élève de l'École militaire de l'air	Élève officier de l'École de l'air	Elève officier du personnel navigant

=== Other ranks ===
The rank insignia of non-commissioned officers and enlisted personnel.

NATO code	OR-9	OR-8	OR-7	OR-6	OR-5	OR-4	OR-3	OR-2	OR-1
(France) French Air and Space Force
(France) French Air and Space Force	Major	Adjudant-chef	Adjudant	Sergent-chef	Sergent	Caporal-chef	Caporal	Aviateur 1^{e} classe	Aviateur 2^{e} classe

== See also ==
- List of Escadres of the French Air Force
- List of French Air and Space Force aircraft squadrons
- French Naval Aviation
- List of military aircraft of France
