= 31e Escadre Aérienne de Ravitaillement et de Transport Stratégiques =

Air refueling and transport unit of the French Air Force

31st Strategic Airlift and Air Refueling Wing
- 31^{e} Escadre Aérienne de Ravitaillement et de Transport Stratégiques
- Active: 27 August 2014 – present
- Country: France
- Branch: Armée de l'air et de l'espace
- Type: Supply - Transport
- Garrison/HQ: BA 125 Istres-Le Tubé Air Base

The 31^{e} Escadre Aérienne de Ravitaillement et de Transport Stratégiques (31st Strategic Airlift and Air Refueling Wing) is an air refueling and transport unit of the French Air and Space Force (Armée de l'air et de l'espace) activated on August 27, 2014 at Istres-Le Tubé Air Base. The wing's air refueling squadron is equipped with 13 Airbus A330 MRTT Phénix.

The wing's squadrons include:

  - Escadron de Ravitaillement en Vol et de Transport Stratégique (ERVTS) 1/31 Bretagne Strategic Air-to-Air Refuelling and Transport Squadron
  - Escadron de Ravitaillement en Vol et de Transport Stratégique 2/31 Estérel Strategic Air-to-Air Refuelling and Transport Squadron
  - Escadron de Transformation Phénix (ETP) 3/31 Landes Operational Conversion Squadron
  - Escadron de Soutien Technique Aéronautique (ESTA) 15/31 Camargue Aeronautical Technical Support Squadron
  - Escadron d'armement Spécialisé (EAS) 66/31 Méditerranée Specialised Arms Squadron

== Previous squadrons ==
- Escadron de Ravitaillement en Vol (ERV) 4/31 Sologne
- Escadron de Soutien Technique Spécialisé (ESTS) 15/93

== Commanding officers ==
- Lieutenant-colonel Olivier Roquefeuil (27 August 2014 – 8 July 2015)
- Lieutenant-colonel Marc Alligier (8 July 2015 – present)
