= École de L'Aviation de Chasse 314 Christian Martell =

Coordinates: 47.432°N 0.723°E

Fighter Aviation School 314 Christian Martell
- École de L'Aviation de Chasse 314 Christian Martell
- Insignia of school
- Active: 1961–2020
- Country: France
- Branch: Armée de l'air et de l'espace
- Type: Trainer aircraft
- Role: Fighter Pilot Training School
- Garrison/HQ: Tours Saint Symphorien Air Base (to 2020); EAC 315 at BA 709 Cognac (2020–)

Aircraft flown
- Trainer: Dassault/Dornier Alpha Jet

École de L'Aviation de Chasse 314 Christian Martell was a French Air and Space Force (Armée de l'air et de l'espace) Fighter Pilot Training School located at Tours Saint Symphorien Air Base (BA 705), Indre-et-Loire, France which operated the Dassault/Dornier Alpha Jet. It was operational from 1961, until Pilatus PC-21 light trainers were ordered to replace its Alpha Jets, which entered service in 2018 with EPAA 00.315 at BA 709 Cognac.

On 12 September 2020, École de Pilotage de l’Armée de l’Air 315 Général Jarry (EPAA 00.315) was merged with the école de l'aviation chasse EAC 00.314, to form l'école de l'aviation de chasse 00.315 "Christian Martell" at Cognac.

EAC 00.315 has Pilatus PC-21 aircraft (EIV 1/13 Artois, EIV 3/4 Limousin et EIV 3/13 Auvergne) and Grob 120 aircraft (EIV 2/12 Picardie, STANEVAL 1/11 Roussillon et EIV 4/11 Jura). It manages des parcours de formations de navigants, désignés par "Mentor" (Mentor 1 ; Mentor 2 à partir de 2025).

The insignia of EAC 00.315 is a stork on a night-blue starry background.

== See also ==
- fr:Centre d'instruction de la chasse, last accessed March 2021
- List of French Air and Space Force aircraft squadrons
