= Escadron de Chasse 3/3 Ardennes =

Fighter Squadron 3/3 Ardennes
- Escadron de Chasse 3/3 Ardennes
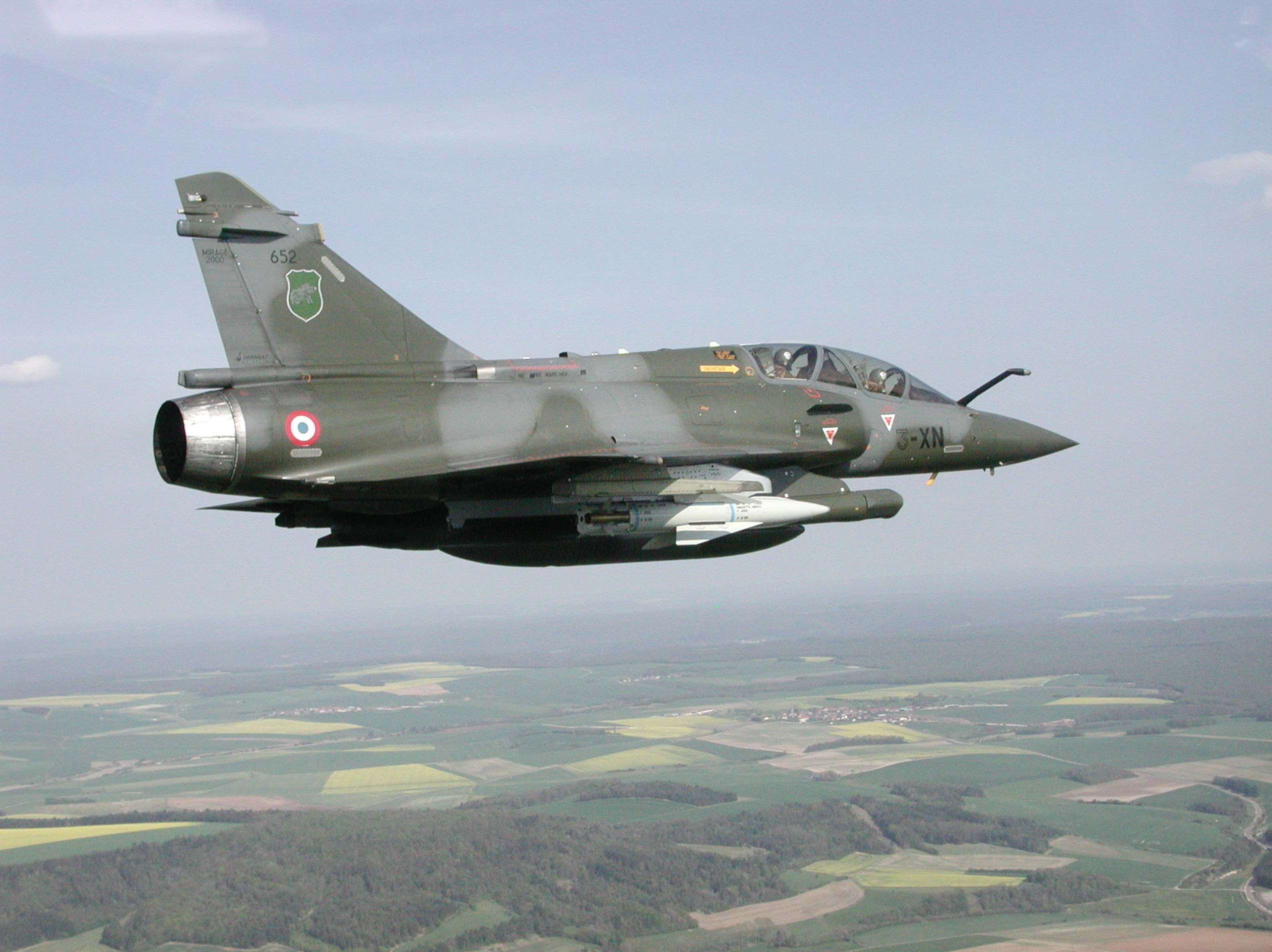
- Mirage 2000D
- Country: France
- Branch: Armée de l'air et de l'espace
- Type: Multirole combat aircraft
- Role: Aerial and Land Combat
- Garrison/HQ: BA 133 Nancy – Ochey Air Base

Aircraft flown
- Fighter: Dassault Mirage 2000D

Escadron de Chasse 3/3 Ardennes (Fighter Squadron 3/3 Ardennes) is a French Air and Space Force (Armée de l'air et de l'espace) fighter squadron currently stationed at BA 133 Nancy – Ochey Air Base which flies the Dassault Mirage 2000D.

== Escadrilles ==
From 1943 to 1994 :

- 1st Escadrille : Escadrille GC III/3 (1) "La Bleue" (The Blue)
- 2nd Escadrille : Escadrille GC III/3 (2) "La Rouge" (The Red)

Since 1994

- 1st Escadrille : Escadrille GC III/3 (1) "La Bleue" (The Blue)
- 2nd Escadrille : Escadrille GC III/3 (2) "La Rouge" (The Red)
- 3rd Escadrille : Escadrille BR 44 (from Escadron de Ravitaillement en Vol 2/93 Sologne)

== Escadres ==
- 3e Escadre de Chasse (07/1944 - 10/1944)
- 4e Escadre de Chasse (10/1944 - 03/1946) / (01/1950 - 10/1950)
- 3e Escadre de Chasse (01/1953 - 11/1957) / (07/1974 - 06/1995) / (09/2014 - ...)

== Denominations ==
- Groupe de Chasse (GC) III/3 Ardennes (1943 - 1946)
- Escadron de Chasse (EC) 4/4 Ardennes (01/1950 - 10/1950)
- Escadron de Chasse 3/3 Ardennes (1953 - ...)

== Aircraft flown ==
- Hawker Hurricane (1943 - 1944)
- Curtiss P-40 Warhawk (05/1944 - 07/1944)
- Bell P-39 Airacobra (07/1944 - 09/1944)
- Republic P-47 Thunderbolt (10/1944 - 1946)
- De Havilland DH 100 Vampire (1946 - 1950)
- Republic F-84 Thunderjet (1953 - 1956)
- Republic F-84F Thunderstreak (1956 - 1957)
- Dassault Mirage 5F (1974 - 1977)
- SEPECAT Jaguar (1977 - 1987)
- Dassault Mirage IIIE (1987 - 1994)
- Dassault Mirage 2000D (1994 - ...)

== See also ==
- List of French Air and Space Force aircraft squadrons
