= Escadron de Transport 88 Larzac =

Transport Squadron 88 Larzac
- Escadron de Transport 88 Larzac
- Country: France
- Branch: French Air and Space Force
- Type: Military transport aircraft
- Role: Transport
- Garrison/HQ: Djibouti–Ambouli International Airport

Aircraft flown
- Transport: Aérospatiale SA 330 Puma; CASA/IPTN CN-235

Escadron de Transport 88 Larzac is a French Air and Space Force squadron located at Djibouti–Ambouli International Airport, Djibouti City, Djibouti which operates the Aérospatiale SA 330 Puma and the CASA/IPTN CN-235.

== See also ==
- List of French Air and Space Force aircraft squadrons
