= Escadron de Drones 1/33 Belfort =

Drone Squadron 1/33 Belfort
- Escadron de Drones 1/33 Belfort
- Active: 2014-
- Country: France
- Branch: Armée de l'air et de l'espace
- Type: Drone Squadron
- Role: Unmanned aerial vehicle operations
- Garrison/HQ: BA 709 Cognac – Châteaubernard Air Base

Aircraft flown
- General Atomics MQ-9 Reaper

Escadron de Drones 1/33 Belfort is a French Air and Space Force (Armée de l'air et de l'espace) Drone Squadron located at BA 709 Cognac – Châteaubernard Air Base, Charente, France which operates the General Atomics MQ-9 Reaper with a detachment at Diori Hamani International Airport, Niamey, Niger.

The first Reaper flight in Africa took place on January 15, 2014 and in France took place on July 4, 2017.

== See also ==
- List of French Air and Space Force aircraft squadrons
