= Escadron de Transport 68 Antilles-Guyane =

Transport Squadron 68 Antilles-Guyane
- Escadron de Transport 68 Antilles-Guyane
- Country: France
- Branch: French Air and Space Force
- Type: Military transport aircraft
- Role: Transport
- Garrison/HQ: Cayenne – Félix Eboué Airport

Aircraft flown
- Transport: Aérospatiale SA 330 Puma; Eurocopter Fennec; CASA/IPTN CN-235

Escadron de Transport 68 Antilles-Guyane is a French Air and Space Force squadron located at Cayenne – Félix Eboué Airport, French Guiana, France which operates the Aérospatiale SA 330 Puma (5 in 2024), Eurocopter Fennec and the CASA/IPTN CN-235.

== See also ==
- List of French Air and Space Force aircraft squadrons
