= Escadron de Transport 52 Tontouta =

Transport Squadron 52 Tontouta
- Escadron de Transport 52 Tontouta
- Country: France
- Branch: French Air and Space Force
- Type: Military transport aircraft
- Role: Transport
- Garrison/HQ: La Tontouta International Airport

Aircraft flown
- Transport: Aérospatiale SA 330 Puma; CASA/IPTN CN-235

Escadron de Transport 52 Tontouta is a French Air and Space Force squadron located at La Tontouta International Airport, New Caledonia which operates the Aérospatiale SA 330 Puma and the CASA/IPTN CN-235.

== See also ==
- List of French Air and Space Force aircraft squadrons
