= Escadron de Transport 41 Verdun =

Transport Squadron 41 Verdun
- Escadron de Transport 41 Verdun
- Country: France
- Branch: French Air and Space Force
- Type: Military transport aircraft
- Role: Transport
- Garrison/HQ: Vélizy – Villacoublay Air Base

Aircraft flown
- Transport: SOCATA TBM 700

Escadron de Transport 41 Verdun is a French Air and Space Force squadron located at Vélizy – Villacoublay Air Base, Yvelines, France which operates the SOCATA TBM 700.

== See also ==
- List of French Air and Space Force aircraft squadrons
