= Centre de Formation à l'Aéronautique Militaire Initiale 5/312 Capitaine Élisabeth Boselli =

Initial Military Flight Training Center 5/312 Capitaine Élisabeth Boselli
- Centre de Formation à l'Aéronautique Militaire Initiale 5/312 Capitaine Élisabeth Boselli
- Country: France
- Branch: Armée de l'air et de l'espace
- Type: Trainer aircraft
- Role: Initial Military Flight Training Center
- Garrison/HQ: Salon-de-Provence Air Base

Aircraft flown
- Trainer: Cirrus SR20; Cirrus SR22

Centre de Formation à l'Aéronautique Militaire Initiale 5/312 Capitaine Élisabeth Boselli is a French Air and Space Force (Armée de l'air et de l'espace) Initial Military Flight Training Center located at Salon-de-Provence Air Base, Bouches-du-Rhône, France which operates the Cirrus SR20 and the Cirrus SR22.

On March 23, 2026, La Poste issued a postage stamp featuring Élisabeth Boselli, the first female fighter pilot to serve in the French Air Force, to pay tribute to her contributions.

== See also ==
- List of French Air and Space Force aircraft squadrons
