= Cognac – Châteaubernard Air Base =

Coordinates: 45°39′30″N 000°19′03″W

Cognac - Châteaubernard Air Base Base aérienne 709 Cognac-Châteaubernard

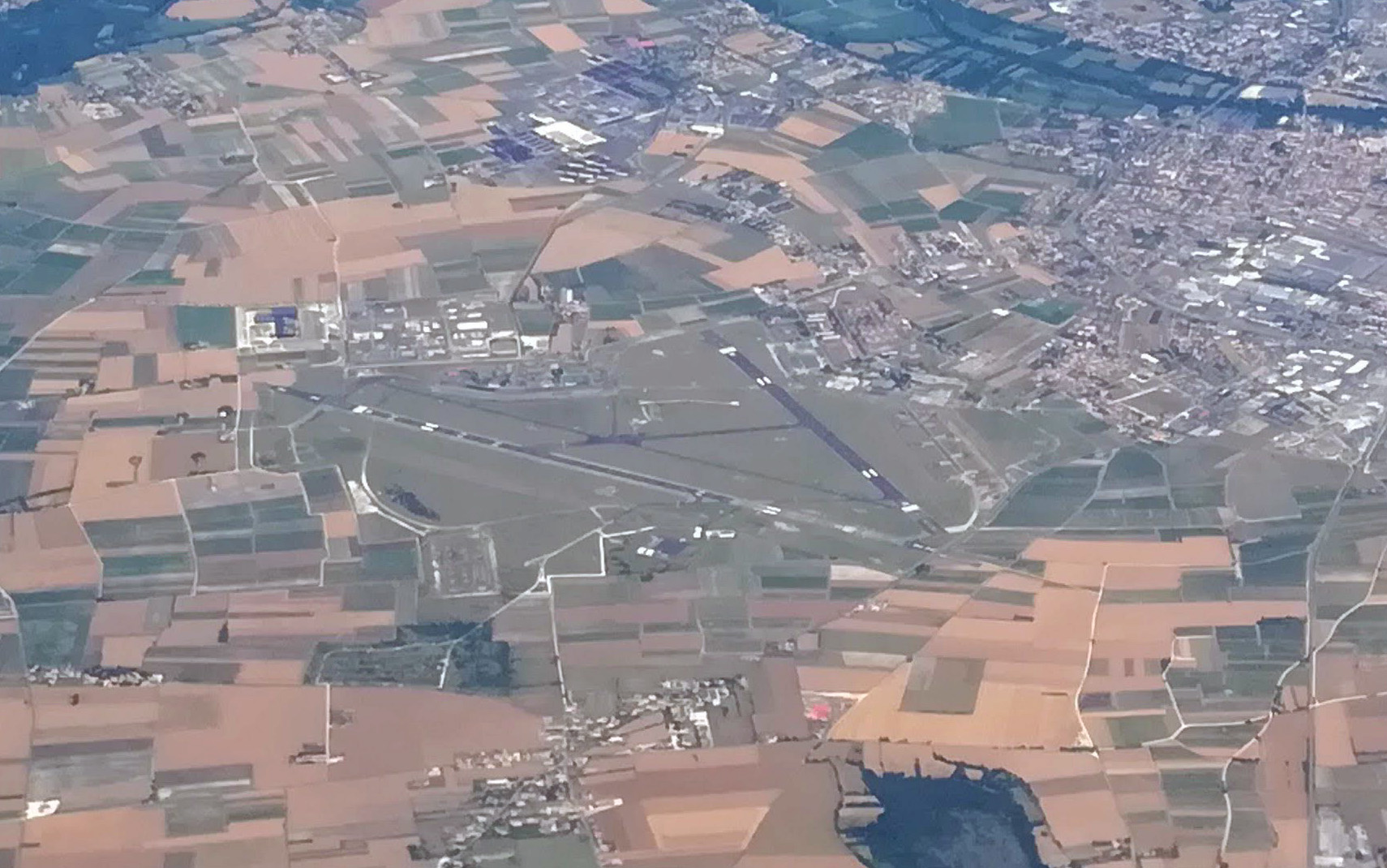
- IATA: CNG; ICAO: LFBG

Summary
- Airport type: Military
- Owner: Government of France
- Operator: Armée de l'air et de l'espace
- Location: Cognac / Châteaubernard
- Elevation AMSL: 102 ft (31 m)
- Interactive map of Cognac - Châteaubernard Air Base

Runways
Direction	Length		Surface
Direction	m	ft	Surface
05/23	2,423	7,949	Paved
09/27	1,875	6,152	Paved
- Sources: French AIP

Cognac – Châteaubernard Air Base (French: Base aérienne 709 Cognac-Châteaubernard or BA 709) (IATA: CNG, ICAO: LFBG) is a base of the French Air and Space Force (Armée de l'air et de l'espace) located in Châteaubernard, 2.8 kilometres south of Cognac. Both locations are communes of the Charente département in the Nouvelle-Aquitaine région of France. The base is home to the Ecole de Pilotage de l'Armee de l'Air, the air force initial pilot training school.

It was used by the German Luftwaffe in World War II. The Luftwaffe's operations included anti-submarine Focke-Wulf Fw 200 Condors as late as July 1944.

== Units ==
- Escadron de Drones 1/33 Belfort with the General Atomics MQ-9 Reaper
- Escadron de Drones 2/33 Savoie with the General Atomics MQ-9 Reaper
- Escadron de Transformation Opérationnelle Drones 3/33 Moselle
- École de Pilotage de l’Armée de l’Air 315 Général Jarry with Pilatus PC-21 and the Grob G 120
- Escadron D'Instruction en Vol 1/13 Artois
- Escadron D'Instruction en Vol 2/12 Picardie

== Accident ==
- On 5 March 1973, Spantax Flight 400, a Convair 990 Coronado, flying from Spain to the United Kingdom with 107 occupants on board collided mid-air with Iberia Flight 504, a McDonnell Douglas DC-9 which was also flying from Spain to the United Kingdom with 68 occupants on board. The Iberia DC-9 crashed killing all 68 people on board that aircraft whereas the Spantax CV-990 performed a successful emergency landing at Cognac – Châteaubernard Air Base saving all 107 people on board that aircraft.
