= List of French Air and Space Force aircraft squadrons =

Many of the former and active Squadrons of the French Air and Space Force have direct lineage links to many of the "dissolved" squadrons. In addition, each Squadron has for military awards and decorations, and a Fanion (squadron standard).

The Air Force has undergone many echelon (ranking) changes at the level of Escadre (Wing), Escadron/Squadrons and Escadrille. The traditions and accomplishments of many Escadre, Escadron and the Lafayette Escadrille and other units can be traced back to World War I.

Squadrons include the following:

== Active Squadrons ==
=== Strategic Air Forces Command (CFAS) ===
- Escadron de Chasse 1/4 Gascogne at BA 113
- Escadron de Chasse 2/4 La Fayette at BA 113
- Escadron de Ravitaillement en Vol et de Transport Stratégiques 1/31 Bretagne Strategic Air Refueling and Transport Squadron at BA 125
- Escadron de Ravitaillement en Vol et de Transport Stratégiques 2/31 Esterel Strategic Air Refueling and Transport Squadron at BA 125
- Escadron de Soutien Technique Spécialisé 15/93 Specialised Technical Support Squadron
- Escadron de Soutien Technique Aéronautique 15/31 Camargue Aeronautical Technical Support Squadron
- Escadron d'armement Spécialisé 66/31 Méditerranée Specialised Arms Squadron

=== Air Forces Command (CFA) ===
==== Fighter Brigade ====
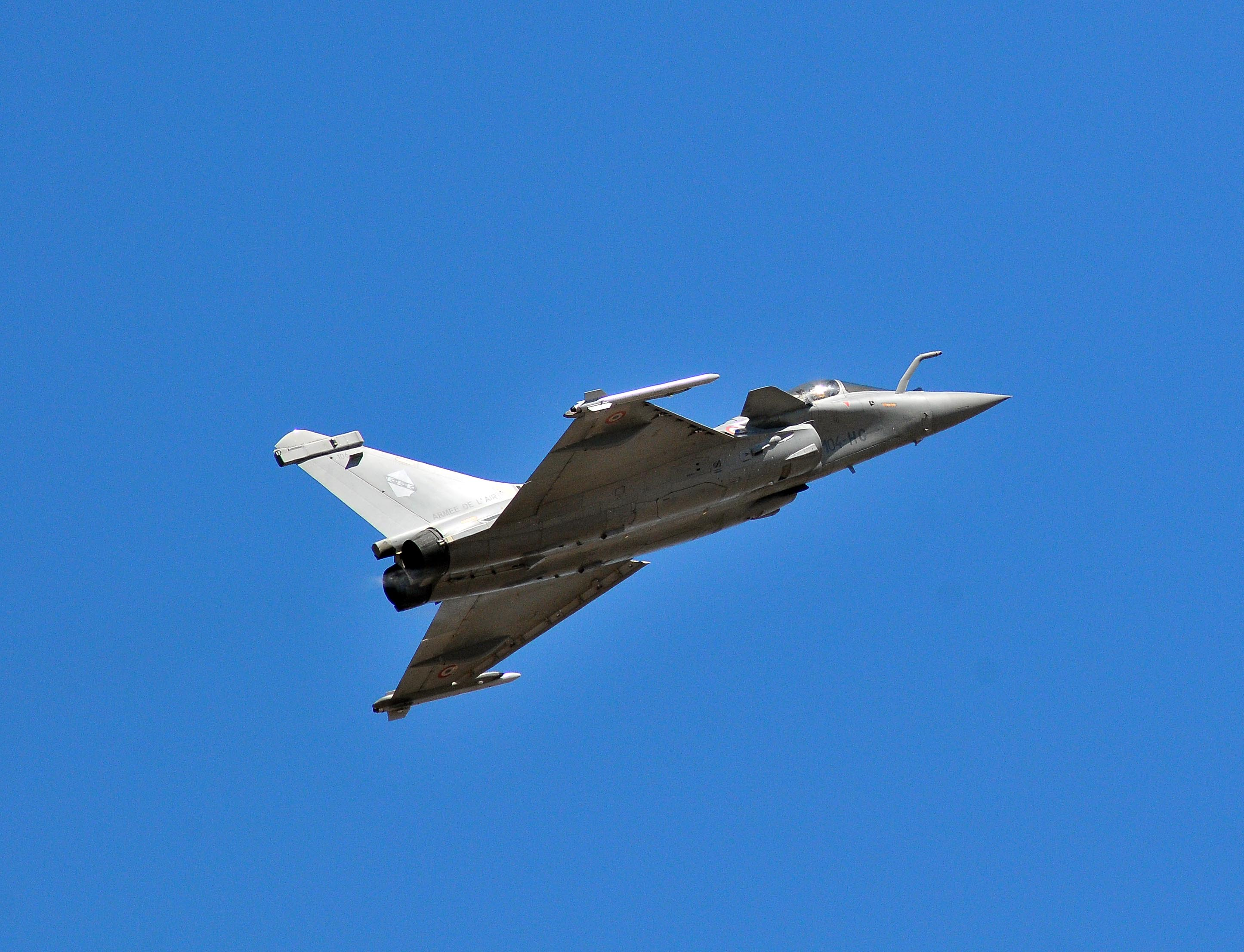
Rafale n° 106 104-HG of the EC 3/30 in 2011.

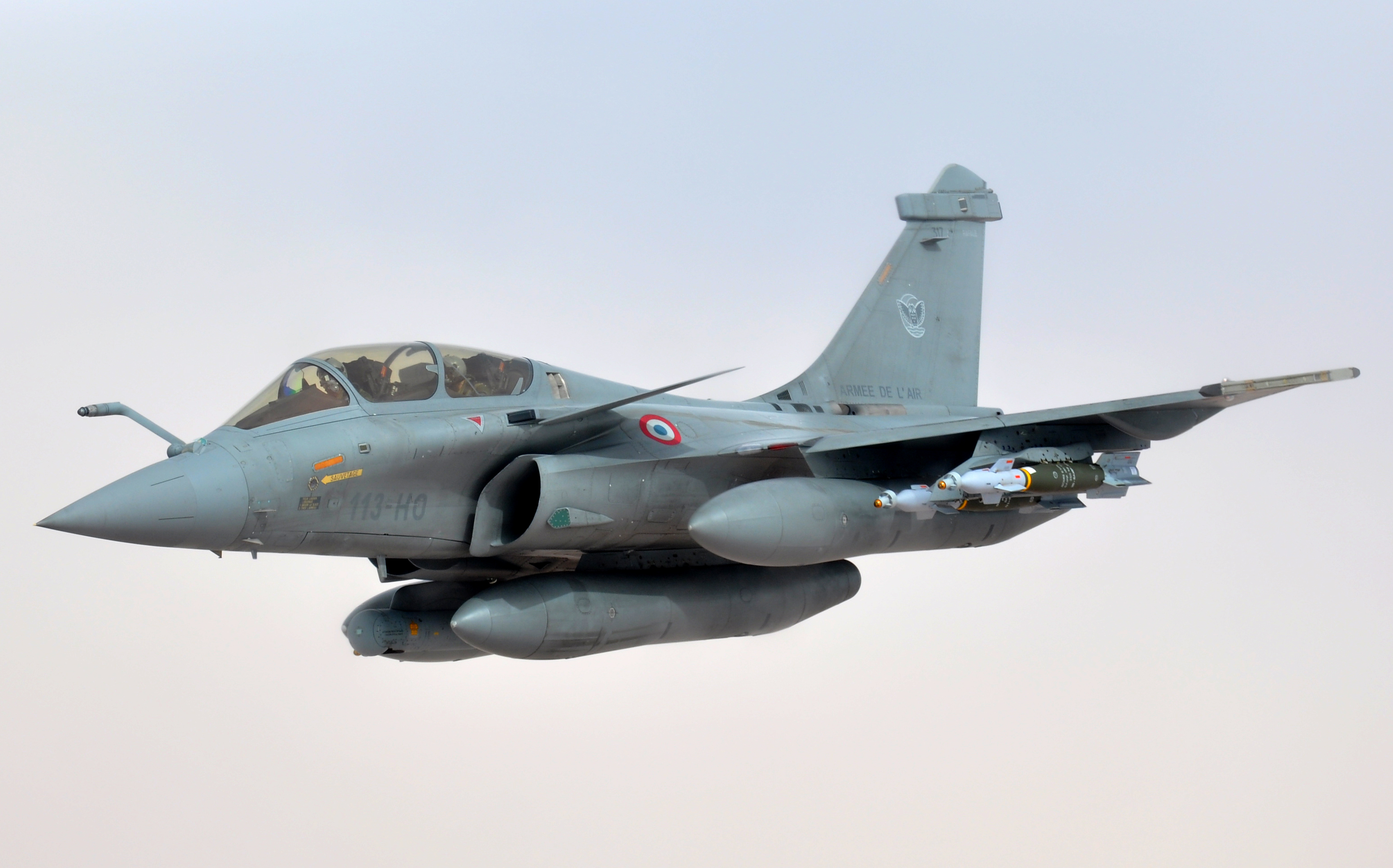
Rafale B 113-HO of the ETR 2/92 Aquitaine during Operation Serval on March 17, 2013.

Fighter Squadrons

- Escadron de Chasse 1/2 Cigognes at BA 116
- Escadron de Chasse 1/3 Navarre at BA 133
- Escadron de Chasse 1/5 Vendée at BA 115
- Escadron de Chasse 2/3 Champagne at BA 133
- Escadron de Chasse 3/3 Ardennes at BA 133
- Escadron de Chasse 3/11 Corse at BA 188
- Régiment de Chasse 2/30 Normandie-Niemen at BA 118
- Escadron de Chasse 3/30 Lorraine at BA 118
- Escadron de Chasse 1/7 Provence at BA 104

Other Squadrons

- Escadron de Transformation Rafale 3/4 Aquitaine (joint Air Force / Navy unit) at BA 113
- Escadron de Chasse et d'Expérimentation 1/30 Côte d'Argent at BA 118
- Escadron de Drones 1/33 Belfort at BA 709

==== Special Air Forces Brigade (BFSA) ====
- Escadron de Transport 3/61 Poitou at BA 123
- Escadron d'Hélicoptères 1/67 Pyrénées at BA 120

==== Projection and Support Air Force Brigade (BAAP) ====
Transport Squadrons

- Escadron de Transport 41 Verdun at BA 107
- Escadron de Transport 43 Médoc at BA 106
- Escadron de Transport 50 Réunion at DA 181 (overseas transport squadron)
- Escadron de Transport 52 Tontouta at BA 186 (overseas transport squadron)
- Escadron de Transport 55 Ouessant at EA 470
- Escadron de Transport 60 at BA 107
- Escadron de Transport 3/60 Estérel at BA 110 (the VIP transport fleet)
- Escadron de Transport 1/61 Touraine at BA 123
- Escadron de Transport 2/61 Franche-Comté at BA 123
- Escadron de Transport 4/61 Béarn at BA 123
- Escadron de Transport 1/62 Vercors at BA 105
- Escadron de Transport 3/62 Ventoux at BA 105
- Escadron de Transport 2/64 Anjou at BA 105
- Escadron de Transport 68 Antilles-Guyane at BA 367 (overseas transport squadron)
- Escadron de Transport 82 Maine at DA 190 (overseas transport squadron)
- Escadron de Transport 88 Larzac at BA 188 (overseas transport squadron)

Helicopters

- Escadron d'Hélicoptères 1/44 Solenzara at BA 126
- Escadron d'Hélicoptères 3/67 Parisis at BA 107
- Escadron d'Hélicoptères 5/67 Alpilles at BA 115

Operational Transition School (ETO)

- Escadron d'Entraînement 3/8 Côte d'Or at BA 120

Other Squadrons

- Mixed Air Group 56 Vaucluse (operational control exerted by Directorate-General for External Security (DGSE))
- Escadrille Aérosanitaire 6/560 Etampes
- Escadron électronique aéroporté 1/54 Dunkerque at BA 105 (electronic intelligence gathering squadron)
- Centre d'Instruction des Equipages d'Hélicoptères 341 Colonel Alexis Santini at BA 115
- Centre d'Instruction des Equipages de Transport 340 Général Lionel de Marmier at BA 123
- Escadron de Formation des Navigateurs de Combat 1/93 at BA 701
- Escadron D'Instruction en Vol 3/5 Comtat Venaissin at BA 701
- Escadron D'Instruction en Vol 2/93 Cévennes at BA 701
- Escadron D'Instruction au vol à Voile Sainte Victoire at BA 701
- Équipe de Voltige de l’Armée de l’Air at BA 701
- Centre de Formation à l'Aéronautique Militaire Initiale 5/312 Capitaine Élisabeth Boselli at BA 701
- École de L'Aviation de Transport 319 Capitaine Jean Dartiques at BA 702
- Escadron D'Instruction en Vol Fourchambault at BA 702
- École de L'Aviation de Chasse 314 Christian Martell at BA 705
- Escadron D'Instruction en Vol 3/4 Limousin at BA 705
- Escadron D'Instruction en Vol 3/13 Auvergne at BA 705
- École de Pilotage de l’Armée de l’Air 315 Général Jarry at BA 709
- Escadron D'Instruction en Vol 1/13 Artois at BA 709
- Escadron D'Instruction en Vol 2/12 Picardie at BA 709

==== Airspace Control Air Force Brigade (BACE) ====
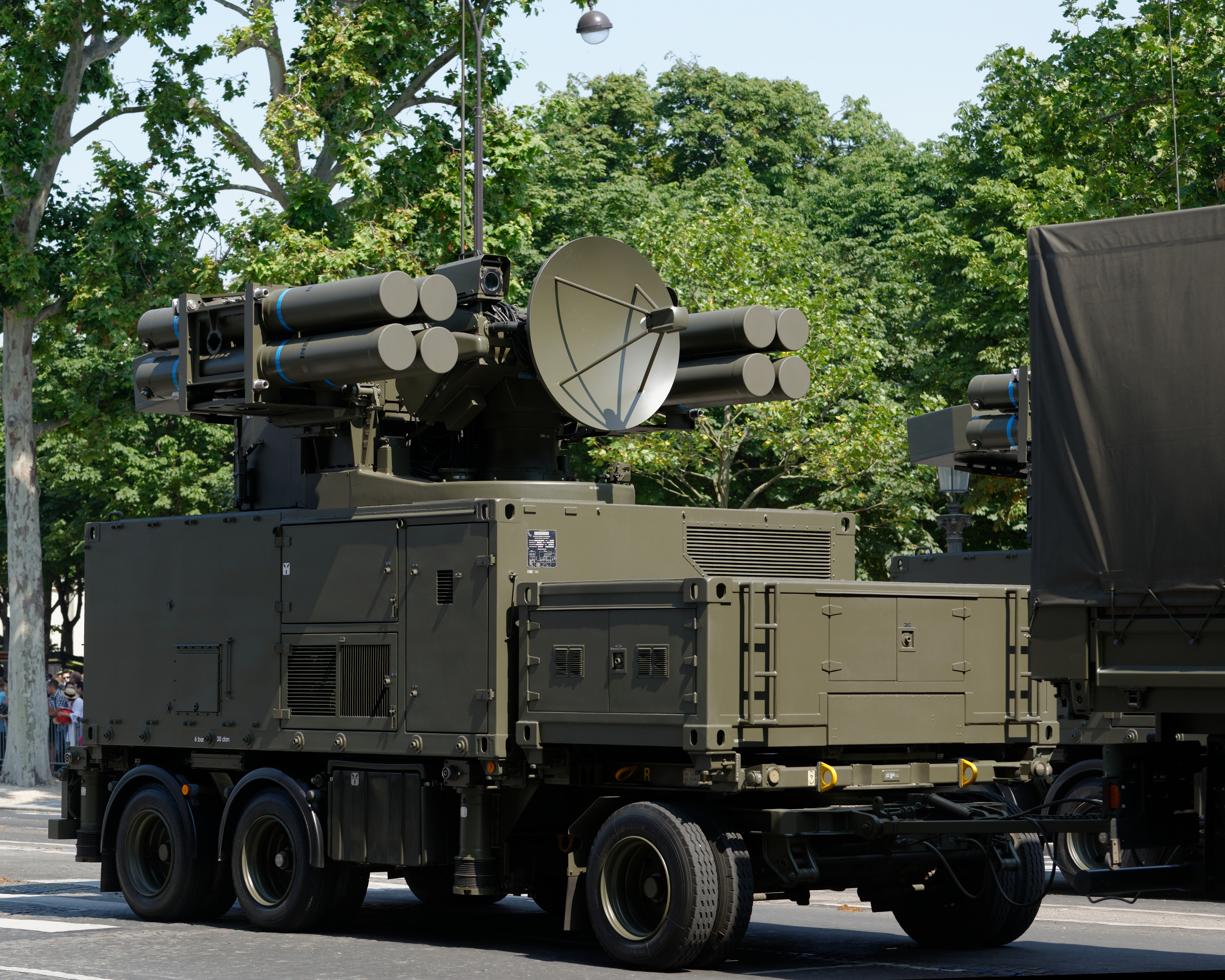
Crotale Missile the Air Defense Ground-to-Air Battery « Tursan » in 2013.

- Escadron de détection et de contrôle aéroportés 36 Berry at BA 702

The following surface-to-air missile squadrons (EDSA) have been attached to BACE since September 1, 2007:

- Escadron de Défense Sol-Air 1/950 Crau
- Escadron de Défense Sol-Air 2/950 Sancerre
- Escadron de Défense Sol-Air 5/950 Barrois
- Escadron de Défense Sol-Air 12/950 Tursan

==== Air Force Security and Intervention Forces Brigade (BAFSI) ====
- Air Parachute Commando No. 10 (Air Force Parachute Commando No. 10, part of Special Operations Command)
- Commando parachutiste de l'air no 20 (Air Force Parachute Commando No. 20)(C.P.A. 20)
- Commando parachutiste de l'air no 30 (Air Force Parachute Commando No. 30) (C.P.A 30)

== Inactive Squadrons ==
=== Escadrons de Bombardement ===
(bombardment squadron)

- Escadron de Bombardement 1/91 Gascogne
- Escadron de Bombardement 2/91 Bretagne
- Escadron de bombardement 3/91 Beauvaisis
- Escadron de bombardement 3/91 Cevennes (ex 2/93, renuméroté avec l'individualisation d'une escadre de ravitaillement en vol)
- Escadron de bombardement 1/92 Bourgogne)
- Escadron de Bombardement 2/92 Aquitaine
- Escadron de bombardement 1/93 Guyenne
- Escadron de bombardement 2/93 Cevennes)
- Escadron de bombardement 3/93 Sambre, initialement Picardie
- Escadron de bombardement 1/94 Bourbonnais puis 1/94 Guyenne
- Escadron de bombardement 2/94 Marne
- Escadron de bombardement 3/94 Arbois

=== Escadrons de Chasse (EC) ===
(Fighter Squadron)

- Escadron de chasse 3/11 Corse & Escadron de Chasse 1/1 Corse
- Escadron de chasse 2/1 Morvan
- Escadron de transformation Mirage 2000D 2/7 Argonne & Escadron de Chasse 3/1 Argonne
- Escadron de chasse 2/2 Côte-d'Or
- Escadron de chasse 3/2 Alsace
- Escadron de chasse 4/2 Coq gaulois)
- Escadron de Transformation Mirage 2000D 4/3 Argonne
- Escadron de chasse 1/4 Dauphiné flew the Mirage 2000N from Luxeuil.
- Escadron de Chasse 4/4 Ardennes
- Escadron de Chasse 1/5 Vendée
- Escadron de Chasse 2/5 Île-de-France at BA 115
- Escadron de chasse 3/5 Comtat Venaissin
- Escadron de chasse 1/6 Oranie
- Escadron de Chasse 2/6 Normandie-Niemen
- Escadron de chasse 2/7 Argonne
- Escadron de chasse 3/7 Languedoc
- Escadron de chasse 4/7 Limousin
- Escadron de chasse 1/8 Maghreb
- Escadron de chasse 1/9 Limousin previously used Mirage 2000N's at BA 125 Istres as EC 3/4.
- Escadron de chasse 2/9 Auvergne
- Escadron de chasse 1/10 Valois
- Escadron de chasse 2/10 Seine
- Escadron de chasse 3/10 Vexin
- Escadron de chasse 1/11 Roussillon
- Escadron de chasse 2/11 Vosges
- Escadron de chasse 4/11 Jura
- Escadron de chasse 2/12 Picardie
- Escadron de chasse 3/12 Cornouaille
- Escadron de chasse 1/13 Artois
- Escadron de chasse 2/13 Alpes
- Escadron de chasse 3/13 Auvergne
- Escadron de chasse 1/20 Aurès Nementcha
- Escadron de chasse 2/20 Ouarsenis
- Escadron de chasse 3/20 Oranie
- Escadron de chasse 1/30 Alsace
- Escadron de chasse 1/30 Loire
- Escadron de chasse 1/30 Normandie-Niemen
- Escadron de chasse 1/30 Valois
- Escadron de chasse 4/30 Vexin
- Escadron de Chasse 3/33 Lorraine
- Escadron de chasse 4/33 Vexin
- Escadron de Chasse et d'Experimentation 5/33 Côte d'Argent flying Dassault Rafale B from BA 188 Mont-de-Marsan in 2013.

=== Escadrons d’Hélicoptères ===
(Helicopter squadron)

- Escadron d'hélicoptères 2/67 Valmy
- Escadron d'hélicoptères 4/67 Durance

=== Escadrons de Ravitaillement en Vol ===
(Air Supply Squadron)

- Escadron de Ravitaillement en vol 4/91 Landes with C-135F at BA 188 Mont-de-Marsan from October 1964.
- Escadron de ravitaillement en vol 1/93 Aunis)
- Escadron de ravitaillement en vol 2/93 Sologne
- Escadron de ravitaillement en vol 3/93 Landes
- Escadron de ravitaillement en vol 4/93 Aunis
- Escadron de ravitaillement en vol 4/94 Sologne

=== Escadrons de Reconnaissance ===
(Reconnaissance squadron)

- Escadron de reconnaissance 1/33 Belfort redesignated Escadron de Drones 1/33 Belfort on September 1, 2010.
- Escadron de reconnaissance 2/33 Savoie operated Mirage F1CT's, Mirage F1CR's and Mirage F1B's from BA 188 Mont-de-Marsan
- Escadron de reconnaissance 3/33 Moselle
- Escadron de reconnaissance 4/33 Moselle
- Escadron de reconnaissance 4/33 Fumasol)
- Escadron de Reconnaissance Stratégique 1/91 Gascogne

=== Escadrons de Transport ===
(Transport Squadron)

- Escadron de Transport 2/61 Béarn)
- Escadron de Transport 3/61 Anjou
- Escadron de transport 4/61 Franche-Comté
- Escadron de transport 2/62 Anjou
- Escadron de transport 2/63 Bigorre
- Escadron de transport 2/63 Vercors
- Escadron de transport 2/64 Maine
- Escadron de transport 3/64 Bigorre
- Escadron de transport 1/65 Vendome
- Escadron de Transport et d'Entraînement 41 Verdun
- Escadron de transport 44 Mistral
- Escadron de transport et d'entraînement 2/65 Rambouillet
- ETOM 82 Tahiti with CN235M-200

=== Escadrons électroniques ===
(Electronic Squadron)

- Escadron électronique 51 Aubrac

=== Escadron d'Entraînement ===
(Training Squadron)

- Escadron d'Entraînement 2/2 Côte d'Or became EE 3/8 Côte d'Or.

=== Escadrons de défense sol-air ===
(Ground-to-Air Defense Squadron)

- Escadron de défense sol-air 6/950 Riquewihr, disbanded 3 July 2009
- Escadron de défense sol-air 10/950 Châteauneuf du Pape

== Abbreviations ==
- CIEH Centre d'instruction des équipages d'hélicoptères (helicopter crew training center)
- CIET Centre d'instruction des équipages de Transport (airlift/transport crew training center)
- CIT Centre d'instruction tactique (tactical instruction center)
- EAC Ecole de l'aviation de chasse (fighter aviation school)
- EAT Ecole de l'aviation de transport (transport aviation school)
- EC Escadron de chasse (fighter wing)
- ECN Escadrille de chasse de nuit (night fighter squadron)
- EDCA Escadron de détection et de contrôle aéroporté (detection and aircraft control wing)
- EE Escadron d'Entrainement (training squadron)
- EPEAA Ecole de pilotage élémentaire de l'armée de l'air (air force basic flight school)
- ER Escadron de reconnaissance (reconnaissance wing)
- ERS Escadron de reconnaissance stratégique (strategic reconnaissance wing)
- ERV Escadron de ravitaillement en vol (flight refueling wing)
- ET Escadron de transport (transport wing)
- ETE Escadron de transport et entraînement (transport and training wing)
- ETM Escadron de transport mixte (mixed transport wing)
- EIV Escadron d’instruction en vol (flight instruction wing)
- ETO Escadron de transition opérationnelle (operational transition wing)
- GAO Groupe Aériens d'Observation (airborne observation group—army co-operation squadrons)
- GC Groupe de chasse (fighter group)
- GE Groupement école (school group)
- GR Groupe de reconnaissance (reconnaissance group)

== Bibliography ==
- Comas, Matthieu (January–February 2020). "GR II/14, le dernier combattant" [Reconnaissance Group II/14, the Last Combatants]. Avions (in French) (233): 44–65. ISSN 1243-8650.
- Ehrengardt, C.-J. (January 1970). "L'action de la chasse de nuit française: un épisode peu connu de la dernière guerre" [French Night-fighter Activity: A Little-known Episode of the Last War]. Le album de fanatique de l'Aviation (in French) (7): 8–12. ISSN 0757-4169.
- Lefèbvre, Jean-Michel (September 1976). "Escadron 2/7 "Argonne" (1)" [Squadron 2/7 Argonne, Part 4]. Le Fana de l'Aviation (in French) (82): 12–17. ISSN 0757-4169.
- Lefèbvre, Jean-Michel (October 1976). "Escadron 2/7 "Argonne" historique (2): escadrilles de traditions" [Historic Squadron 2/7 Argonne, Part 3: Ancestral Flights]. Le Fana de l'Aviation (in French) (83): 16–19. ISSN 0757-4169.
- Lefèbvre, Jean-Michel (November 1976). "Escadron 2/7 "Argonne" historique (3): les grands ancient de "Coqs" hommes et avions 1914–1918" [Historic Squadron 2/7 Argonne, Part 3: The Grand Old "Roosters", Men and Aircraft 1914–1918]. Le Fana de l'Aviation (in French) (84): 22–25. ISSN 0757-4169.
- Lefèbvre, Jean-Michel (December 1976). "Escadron 2/7 "Argonne" historique (4): de la Bataille de France aux chasseurs à réaction" [Historic Squadron 2/7 Argonne, Part 4: From the Battle of France to Jet Fighters]. Le Fana de l'Aviation (in French) (85): 20–24. ISSN 0757-4169.
- Villatout, Paul (April 2004). "Une histoire du I/56 Vaucluse: l'escadrille masquée (1)" [The History of I/56 Vaucluse: The Masked Squadron, Part 2]. Le Fana de l'Aviation (in French) (413): 18–25. ISSN 0757-4169.
- Villatout, Paul (May 2004). "Une histoire du I/56 Vaucluse: l'escadrille masquée (2)" [The History of I/56 Vaucluse: The Masked Squadron, Part 2]. Le Fana de l'Aviation (in French) (414): 64–76. ISSN 0757-4169.
