= Escadron de Transport 43 Médoc =

Transport Squadron 43 Médoc
- Escadron de Transport 43 Médoc
- Country: France
- Branch: French Air and Space Force
- Type: Military transport aircraft
- Role: Transport
- Garrison/HQ: Bordeaux–Mérignac Airport

Aircraft flown
- Transport: SOCATA TBM 700; Eurocopter Fennec

Escadron de Transport 43 Médoc is a French Air and Space Force squadron located at Bordeaux–Mérignac Airport, Gironde, France which operates the SOCATA TBM 700 and the Eurocopter Fennec.

== See also ==
- List of French Air and Space Force aircraft squadrons
