= Escadron d'Hélicoptères 1/44 Solenzara =

Helicopter Squadron 1/44 Solenzara
- Escadron d'Hélicoptères 1/44 Solenzara
- Active: 1988 as EH 6/67
- Country: France
- Branch: French Air and Space Force
- Type: Military helicopter
- Garrison/HQ: Solenzara Air Base

Aircraft flown
- Transport: Aérospatiale SA 330 Puma

Escadron d'Hélicoptères 1/44 Solenzara is a French Air and Space Force squadron located at Solenzara Air Base, Haute-Corse, France which operates the Aérospatiale SA 330 Puma.

The 'Solenzara' helicopter squadron was created in Novembre 1988 under the designation EH 06.067, but the presence of hélicoptèrs at Base aérienne 126 dates much further back, to 1964.

== See also ==
- List of French Air and Space Force aircraft squadrons
