= Escadron de Transport 50 Réunion =

Transport Squadron 50 Réunion
- Escadron de Transport 50 Réunion
- Active: 1951 -
- Country: France
- Branch: French Air and Space Force
- Type: Military transport aircraft
- Role: Transport
- Garrison/HQ: Roland Garros Airport

Aircraft flown
- Transport: CASA/IPTN CN-235

Escadron de Transport 50 Réunion is a French Air and Space Force squadron located at Roland Garros Airport, Réunion, France which operates the CASA/IPTN CN-235.

== Denominations ==
1951 : Created through the fusion of Escadrille d'Outre-Mer (EOM) 85 and Groupe de Liaisons Aériennes (GLA) 50 in Madagascar

- Groupe Aérien Mixte d'Outre-Mer (GAMOM) 50 (1951 - 1976)
- Escadron de Transport Outre-Mer (ETOM) 50 (1976 - 2012)
- Escadron de Transport (ET) 50 (since 2012)

== Aircraft used ==
=== Planes ===
- Amiot AAC.1 Toucan
- SNCAC NC 701 Martinet
- Dassault MD-315 Flamant (1951 - 1964)
- Douglas C-47 Skytrain (1957 - 1968)
- Max-Holste MH-1521 Broussard (1959 - 1964)
- Nord 2501 Noratlas (1968 - 1976)
- Transport Allianz C-160F/NG/R Transall (1973 - 2015)
- CASA/ ITPN CN-235-300 (2015 - ...)

=== Helicopters ===
- Bell 47 (1959 - 1964)
- SNCASE SE 313 Alouette II (1965 - ...)
- Sud-Aviation SA.316 Alouette III (... - 1992)
- Aérospatiale AS.555 Fennec (1992 - 2012)

== See also ==
- List of French Air and Space Force aircraft squadrons

== Bibliography ==
- Brun, Hervé (August 1996). "L'Escadron de Transport et Entraînment ETE 44: 50 ans au service de la collectivité (1ère partie)" [Transport and Training Squadron ETE 44: 50 Years of Service to the Community]. Avions: Toute l'aéronautique et son histoire (in French) (41): 2–4. ISSN 1243-8650.
- Brun, Hervé (September 1996). "L'Escadron de Transport et Entraînment ETE 44: 50 ans au service de la collectivité (2ème partie)". Avions: Toute l'aéronautique et son histoire (in French) (42): 31–35. ISSN 1243-8650.
