= Escadron de Transport 82 Maine =

Transport Squadron 82 Maine
- Escadron de Transport 82 Maine
- Country: France
- Branch: French Air and Space Force
- Type: Military transport aircraft
- Role: Transport
- Garrison/HQ: Faa'a International Airport

Aircraft flown
- Transport: CASA/IPTN CN-235

Escadron de Transport 82 Maine is a French Air and Space Force squadron located at Faa'a International Airport, French Polynesia which operates the CASA/IPTN CN-235.

== See also ==
- List of French Air and Space Force aircraft squadrons
