= Aérospatiale SA 330 Puma =

1965 transport helicopter family by Sud Aviation

SA 330 Puma
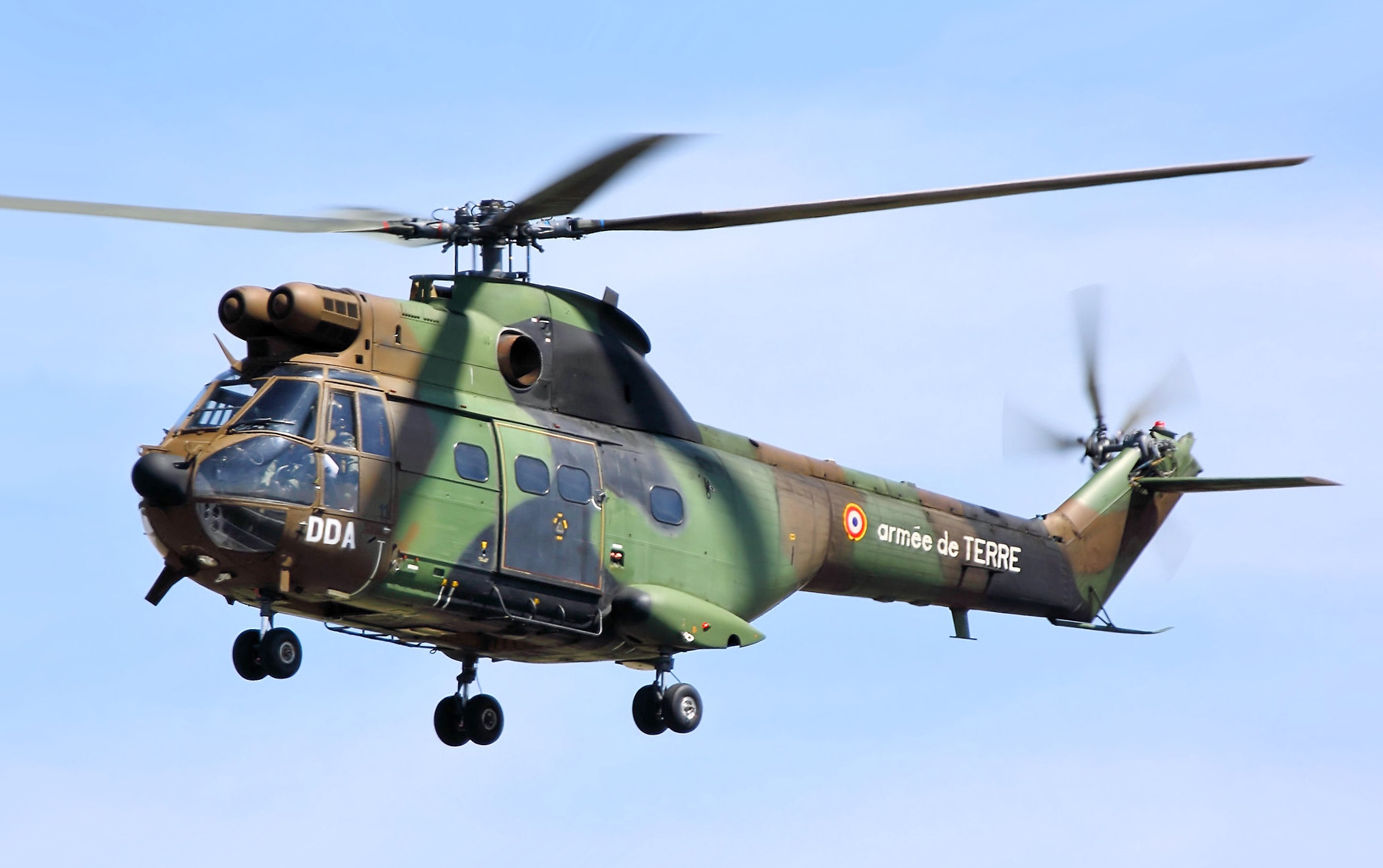
- A French Army Puma performing over RIAT, 2010

General information
- Type: Utility helicopter
- National origin: France
- Manufacturer: Sud Aviation; Aérospatiale
- Status: In service
- Primary users: French Army Royal Air Force (until 2025); Romanian Air Force; Pakistan Army
- Number built: 697

History
- Manufactured: 1968–1987
- Introduction date: 1968
- First flight: 15 April 1965
- Variants: IAR 330; Atlas Oryx
- Developed into: Eurocopter AS332 Super Puma; Eurocopter AS532 Cougar; Denel Rooivalk

The Aérospatiale SA 330 Puma is a four-bladed, twin-engined medium transport/utility helicopter designed and originally produced by the French aerospace manufacturer Sud Aviation.

The Puma was developed as a new design during the mid-1960s in response to a French Army requirement for a medium-sized all-weather utility helicopter. Powered by a pair of Turbomeca Turmo turboshaft engines, it was designed to transport up to 16 seated soldiers, or a maximum of six litters with four attendants for casualty evacuation, along with carrying up to 2,500 kg of cargo either internally or using an external sling. The design of the Puma incorporated several innovations, including an automatic blade inspection system and relatively advanced anti-vibration measures integrated into the main gearbox and main rotor blades. It was also designed to be capable of operating at night, under inhospitable flying conditions and in climates from Arctic to desert. The Puma also has an intentionally high level of reserve power to permit effective flight even at its maximum weight with only a single operational engine.

On 15 April 1965, the first prototype performed its maiden flight; the first production standard Puma made its first flight during September 1968. Deliveries to the French Army commenced in early 1969; the type quickly proved itself to be a commercial success. Production of the Puma continued into the 1980s under Sud Aviation's successor company Aérospatiale. It was also license-produced in Romania as the IAR 330; two unlicensed derivatives, the Denel Rooivalk attack helicopter and Atlas Oryx utility helicopter, were built in South Africa. Several advanced derivatives have been developed, such as the AS332 Super Puma and AS532 Cougar, and have been manufactured by Eurocopter and its successor company Airbus Helicopters since the early 1990s. These descendants of the Puma remain in production.

Significant operations include the Gulf War, the South African Border War, the Portuguese Colonial War, the Yugoslav Wars, the Lebanese Civil War, the Iraq War, and the Falklands War. Numerous operators have chosen to modernise their fleets, often adding more capabilities and new features, such as glass cockpits, Global Positioning System (GPS) navigation, and defense measures. The type also saw popular use in the civilian field and has been operated by a number of civil operators. One of the largest civil operators of the Puma was Bristow Helicopters, which regularly used it for off shore operations over the North Sea.

== Development ==
The SA 330 Puma was originally developed by Sud Aviation to meet a requirement of the French Army for a medium-sized all-weather helicopter capable of carrying up to 20 soldiers as well as various cargo-carrying duties. The choice was made to develop a new design for the helicopter, work began in 1963 with backing from the French government. The first of two Puma prototypes flew on 15 April 1965; six further pre-production models were also built, the last of which flew on 30 July 1968. During testing, one SA 330 was fitted with a large Fenestron; however, it was concluded that there were practical limits to how large a helicopter such a configuration would be suited to, and production examples of the Puma retained a conventional tail rotor instead. The first production SA 330 Puma flew in September 1968, with deliveries to the French Army starting in early 1969.

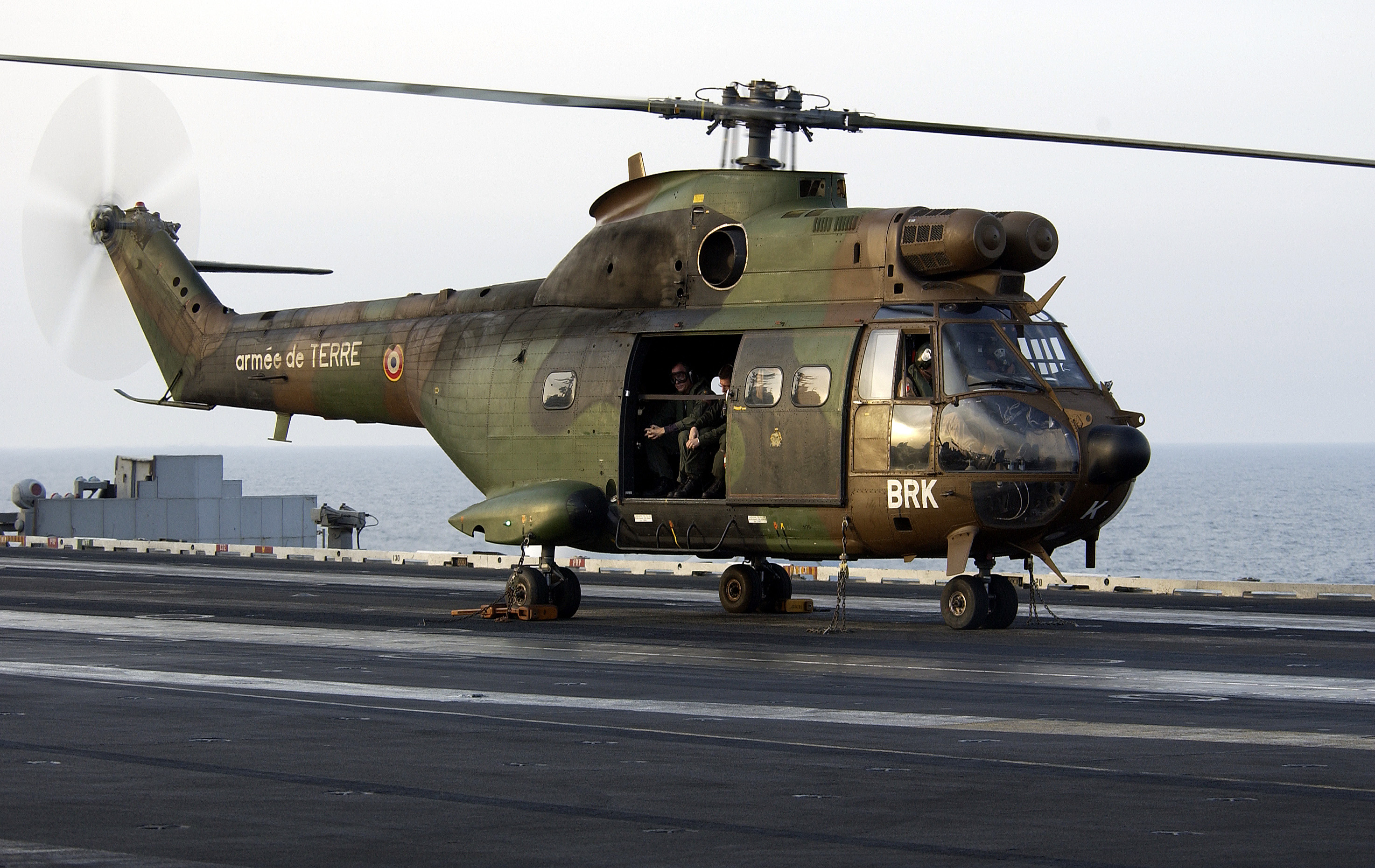
SA 330B Puma, 2004

In 1967, the Puma was selected by the Royal Air Force (RAF), who were impressed by the Puma's performance. It was given the designation Puma HC Mk 1. A significant joint manufacturing agreement was signed between Aerospatiale and Westland Helicopters of the UK. The close collaboration between the French and British firms would lead to purchases of Aérospatiale Gazelle by the UK and the Westland Lynx by France. Under this agreement, Westland manufactured a range of components and performed the assembly of Pumas ordered by the RAF.

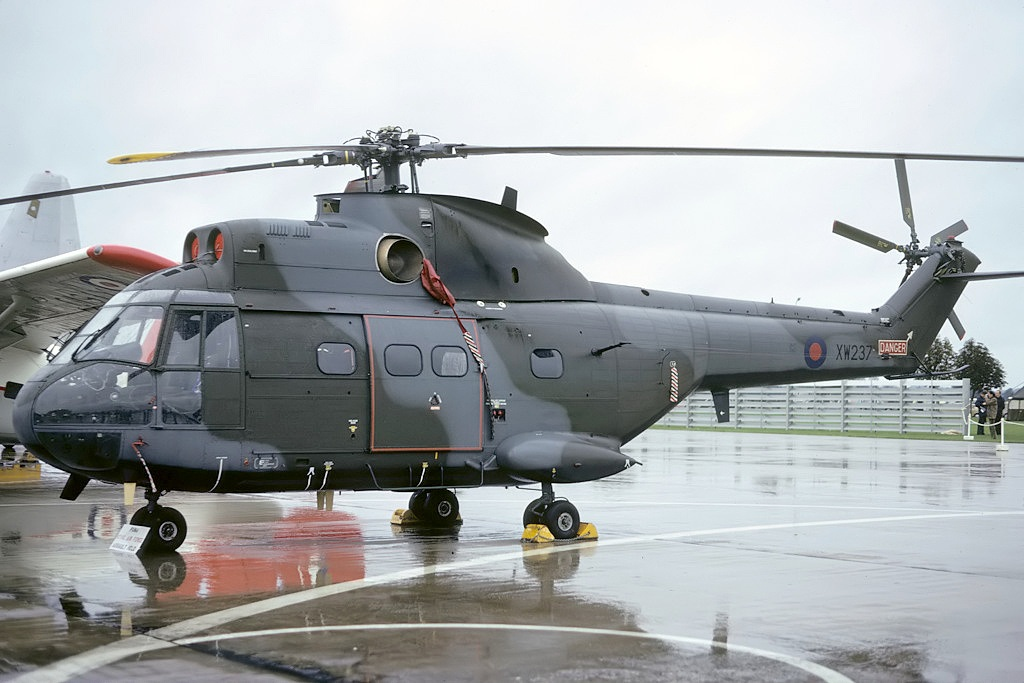
RAF Westland Puma, 1974

The SA 330 was a success on the export market, numerous countries purchased military variants of the Puma to serve in their armed forces; the type was also popularly received in the civil market, finding common usage by operators for transport duties to off-shore oil platforms. Throughout most of the 1970s, the SA 330 Puma was the best selling transport helicopter being produced in Europe. By July 1978, over 50 Pumas had already been delivered to civil customers, and the worldwide fleet had accumulated in excess of 500,000 operational hours.

Romania entered into an arrangement with Aerospatiale to produce the Puma under license as the IAR 330, manufacturing at least 163 of the type for the Romanian armed forces, civil operators, and several export customers of their own. Indonesia also undertook domestic manufacturing of the SA 330. South Africa, a keen user of the type, performed their own major modification and production program conducted by the government-owned Atlas Aircraft Corporation to upgrade their own Pumas, the resulting aircraft was named Oryx. In the 1990s, Denel would also develop an attack helicopter for the South African Air Force based on the Puma, known as the Denel Rooivalk.

In 1974, Aerospatiale began development of improved Puma variants, aiming to produce a successor to the type; these efforts would cumulate in the AS332 Super Puma. The first prototype AS332 Super Puma took flight on 13 September 1978, featuring more powerful engines and a more aerodynamically efficient extended fuselage; by 1980, production of the AS332 Super Puma had overtaken that of the originating SA 330 Puma. Production of the SA 330 Puma by Aérospatiale ceased in 1987, by which time a total of 697 had been sold; production in Romania would continue into the 21st century.

== Design ==
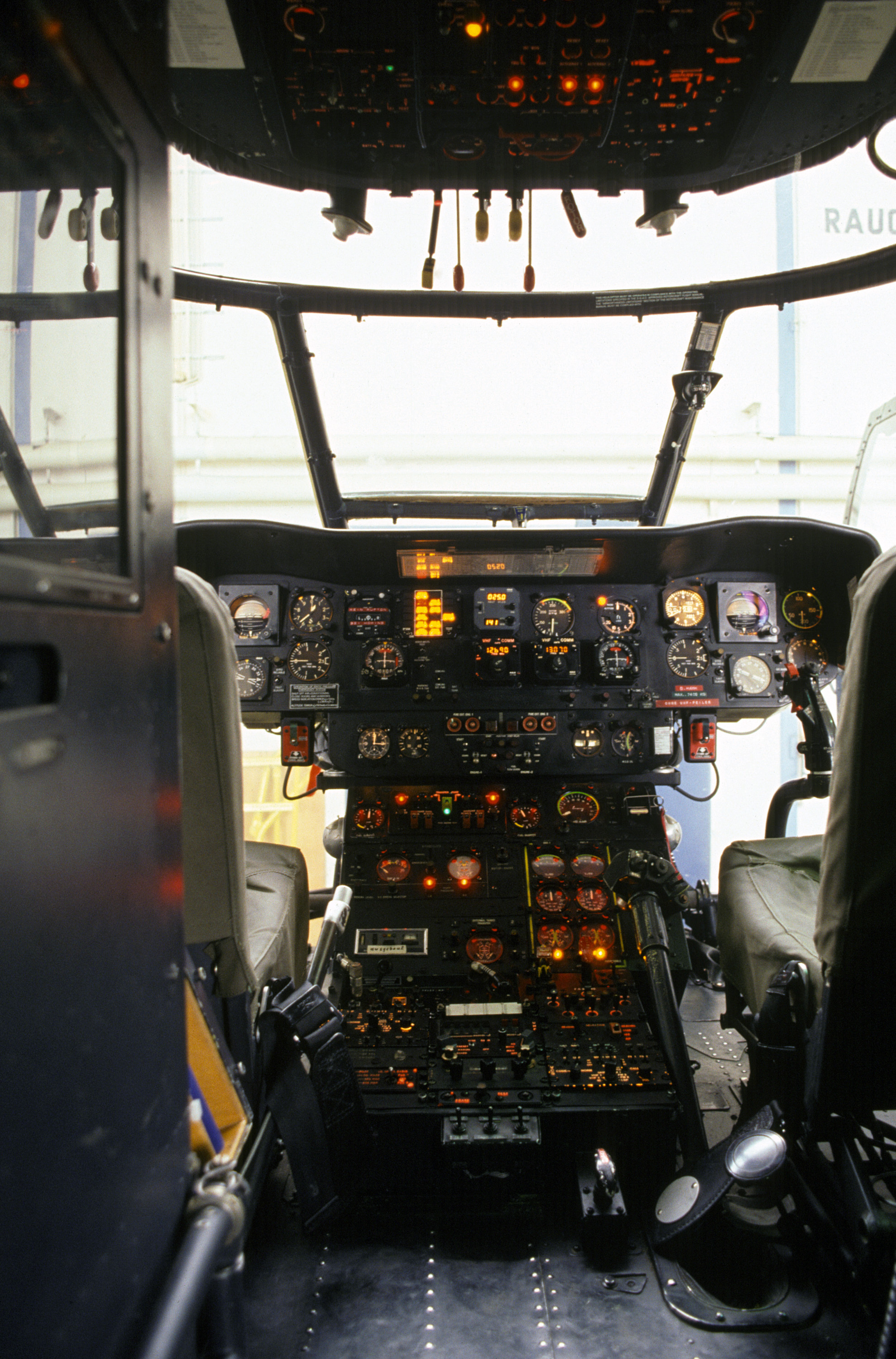
Instrument panel of an SA 330 Puma in service with the West German border police, 1985.

The Aérospatiale SA 330 Puma is a twin-engine helicopter principally intended for personnel transport and logistic support duties. As a troop carrier, up to 16 soldiers can be accommodated on foldable seats, while in a casualty evacuation configuration, the same cabin can hold up to six litters and four additional personnel. The Puma can also perform cargo transport duties, either via the external carriage of underslung payloads on a dedicated cargo hook or using the internal cabin space; up to a maximum weight of 2500 kg of cargo can be carried at a time. Civilian Pumas feature a variety of cabin layouts, typically intended for various forms of passenger transport, including VIPs. In a search and rescue capacity, a hoist is commonly installed, often mounted on the starboard fuselage.

A pair of roof-mounted Turbomeca Turmo turboshaft engines power the Puma's four-blade main rotor. The rotors are driven via a five reduction stage transmission at a typical speed of 265 rpm. The design of the transmission featured several unique and uncommon innovations for the time, such as single-part manufacturing of the rotor shaft and the anti-vibration measures integrated into the main gearbox and main rotor blades. The Puma also featured an automatic blade inspection system, which guarded against and alerted crews to fatigue cracking in the rotor blades. It is furnished with a pair of hydraulic systems that intentionally operate independently of one another, one system powering only the aircraft's flight controls while the other serves the autopilot, undercarriage, and rotor brake, as well as the flight controls.

In terms of flight performance, the Puma was designed to be capable of high speeds, exhibit great maneuverability, and possess favourable hot-and-high performance; the engines have an intentionally high level of reserve power to enable a Puma to fly effectively even at maximum weight with only one functioning engine and proceed with its mission if circumstances require. The cockpit is provisioned with conventional dual controls for both a pilot and copilot, a third seat is provided in the cockpit for a reserve crew member or commander. The Puma features a SFIM-Newmark Type 127 electro-hydraulic autopilot; the autopilot is capable of roll and pitch stabilization, the load hook operator can also directly perform corrective adjustments of the helicopter's position from their station via the autopilot.

The Puma is readily air-transportable by tactical airlifters, such as the Transall C-160 and the Lockheed C-130 Hercules; the main rotor, landing gear, and tailboom are all detachable to lower space requirements. Ease of maintenance was one of the objectives pursued in the Puma's design; many of the components and systems that would require routine inspection were positioned to be visible from ground level, use of life-limited components was minimised, and key areas of the mechanical systems were designed to be readily accessed. The Puma is also capable of operating at nighttime, in inhospitable flying conditions, or in a wide range of climates from Arctic to desert environments.

Although not included during the original production run, numerous operators of Pumas have installed additional features and modern equipment over the rotorcraft's service life. The RAF have equipped their Puma fleet with Global Positioning System (GPS) navigation equipment, along with an assortment of self-defense measures including infrared countermeasures and automatic flares/chaff dispensers, and night vision goggles for night-time flights. The French Army Light Aviation have modernised their Pumas to meet International Civil Aviation Organization standards, this involved the addition of new digital systems, including mission command and control systems, such as the Sitalat data link. Third-party companies such as South Africa's Thunder City have provided life extension and modernisation programmes for the Puma, some operators have opted to refurbish their fleets with glass cockpits.

== Operational history ==
=== Argentina ===
During the Falklands War of 1982, five SA 330 Pumas of the Argentine Army and one of the Argentine Coast Guard were deployed to the theatre; these could either operate from the decks of Navy vessels as well as performing missions across the breadth of the islands; all were lost in the ensuing conflict. On 3 April, while landing Argentine troops as part of the capture of South Georgia, a Puma was badly damaged by small arms fire from British ground forces and crashed into terrain shortly after. On 9 May, a single Puma was destroyed by a Sea Dart anti-aircraft missile launched from HMS Coventry.

On 23 May, a pair of Royal Navy Sea Harriers intercepted three Argentine Pumas during a supply mission to Port Howard. In the ensuing engagement, one Puma was destroyed after colliding with the terrain, while a second was disabled and subsequently destroyed by cannon fire from the Sea Harriers. The third Puma escaped.

On 30 May, the fifth Puma was lost near Mount Kent. According to the Argentine news website MercoPress, the helicopter was shot down by a Stinger missile fired by SAS ground forces. Six members of the Argentine National Gendarmerie Special Forces were killed and a further eight were wounded in the incident.

=== France ===
In September 1979, four Pumas were employed during Operation Barracuda to transport a French assault team directly upon the government headquarters of the Central African Empire; after which confiscated valuables and assorted diplomatic and political records were quickly extracted to the nearby French embassy by continuous air lifts by the Pumas.

One distinctive use of the Puma in French service was as a VIP transport for carrying the President of France both at home and during overseas diplomatic engagements; these duties were transferred to the larger AS332 Super Puma as that became available in sufficient numbers.

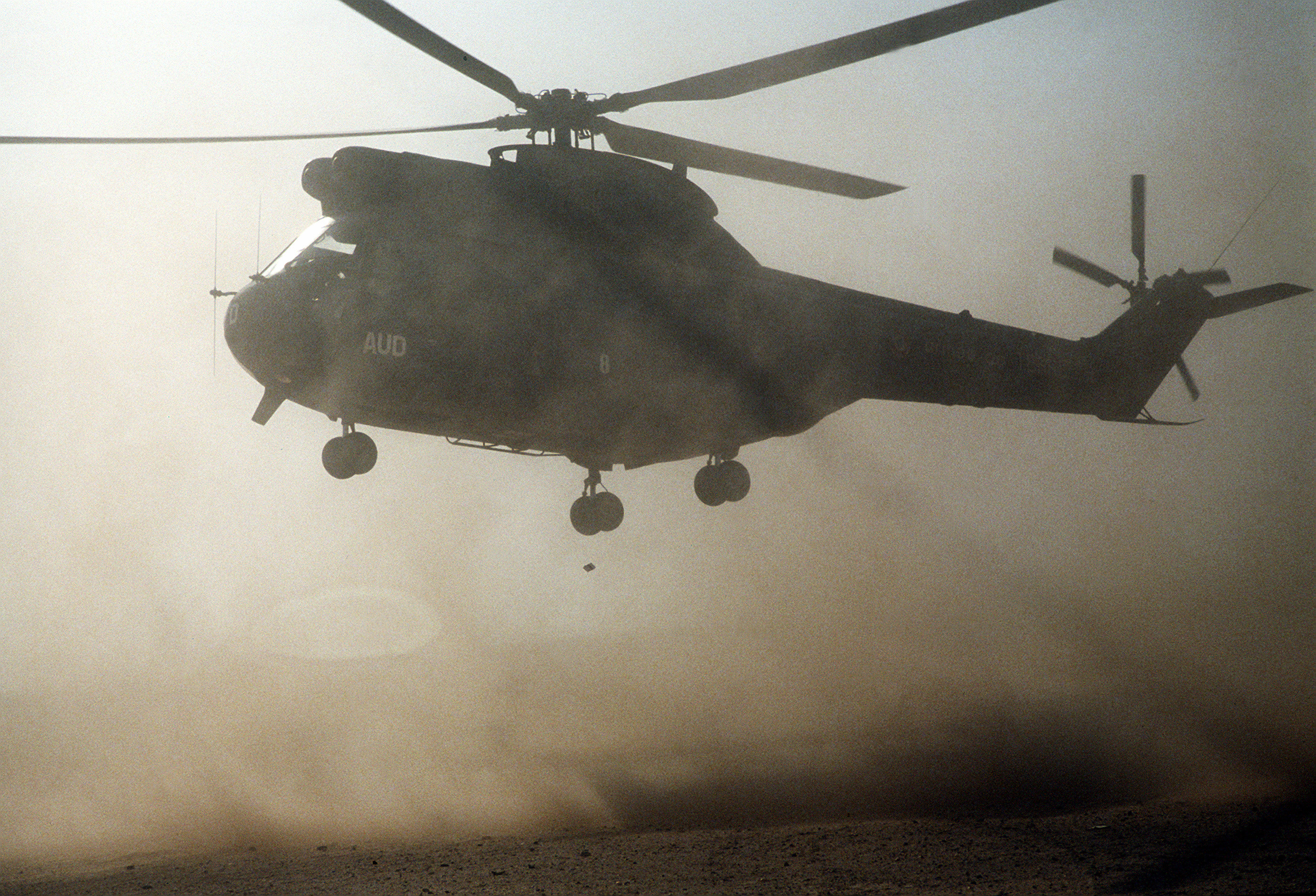
French Puma during Operation Desert Shield, 1990

During the 1991 First Gulf War, France chose to dispatch several Pumas in support of coalition forces engaged in a conflict with Saddam Hussein's Iraq. Those Pumas that had been assigned to the role of performing combat search-and-rescue duties were quickly retrofitted with GPS receivers to enhance their navigational capabilities.

As part of France's contribution to the 1990s NATO-led intervention in the Yugoslav Wars, a number of French Pumas operated in the region alongside other Puma operators such as Britain and the United Arab Emirates; one frequent mission for the type was the vital provision of humanitarian aid missions to refugees escaping ongoing ethnic genocide. In April 1994, a French Puma performed a nighttime extraction of a British SAS squad and a downed Sea Harrier pilot from deep inside hostile Bosnian territory, the aircraft came under small arms fire while retreating from the area. On 18 June 1999, a single coordinated aerial insertion of two companies of French paratroopers was performed by 20 Pumas, helping to spearhead the rapid securing of Kosovska Mitrovica by NATO ground forces.

By 2010, both the French Army and French Navy have opted to procure separate variants of the NHIndustries NH90 to ultimately replace the Puma in French military service. Starting in June 2014, a pair of Pumas of Escadron d'Hélicoptères 1/67 'Pyrénées (EH 1/60) were deployed to Chad and Niger from June 2014 as part of Operation Barkhane to disrupt Islamist insurgency in the Sahel region. Initially operated from N'Djamena in Chad, the detachment later moved forwards to Dirkou and Madama in Niger, supporting ground troops and interdicting supply routes for the insurgent; the detachment returned to France in September 2015 after being relieved by other French Army assets. Roughly 20 SA 330 Pumas remained in French Air and Space Force service by 2016.

=== Lebanon ===
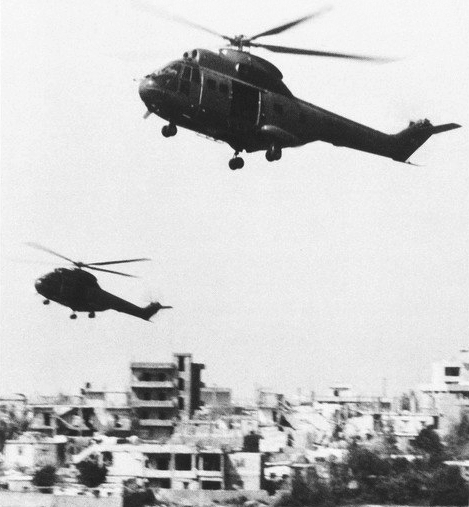
Pair of Pumas flying over Beirut, 1983

Between 1980 and 1984, the Lebanese Air Force received from France ten SA 330C Pumas to equip its newly raised 9th transport squadron at Beirut Air Base, where it was initially based. In 1983, the squadron was relocated north of Beirut and its Pumas were dispersed across small improvised helipads around Jounieh and Adma for security reasons. On 23 August 1984, a Puma carrying the Lebanese Armed Forces' Chief-of-staff and commander of the Seventh Brigade, General Nadim al-Hakim, and eight other senior military officers crashed in thick fog near Beirut, killing all personnel aboard. On 1 June 1987, the Lebanese Prime-Minister Rachid Karami was assassinated aboard a Puma en route to Beirut when a bomb exploded in an attaché case on his lap; the explosion also injured Interior Minister Abdullah Rassi and three of the other twelve aides and crewmen on the Puma, which was severely damaged.

During the final phase of the Lebanese Civil War, the Puma fleet – now reduced to seven or six helicopters of flightworthy condition – was typically being used to conduct liaison flights with neighboring Cyprus on behalf of General Michel Aoun's interim military government, although fuel shortages and maintenance problems forced their crews to typically ground them until the end of the war in October 1990. After the conflict, the Lebanese Air Force Command made consistent efforts to rebuild its transport helicopter squadron with the help of the United Arab Emirates and seven IAR 330 SM helicopters formerly in service with the United Arab Emirates Air Force were delivered in 2010.

In 2013, the Lebanese Air Force converted an IAR 330 SM into a helicopter gunship by mounting on hardened side-swivel mounts a single ADEN Mk 4/5 30mm revolver cannon on a modified pod and a pair of SNEB 68mm rocket launchers taken from decommissioned Hawker Hunter FGA.70 and FGA.70A fighter aircraft. Re-designated SA 330SM, the resulting Puma gunship underwent trials on October 10 that same year during aerial maneuvers held in Hamat Air Base. Although the trials were successful, the SA 300SM was not accepted for active service, with the Lebanese Air Force Command settling instead on an armed version of the Eurocopter AS532 Cougar, of which seven helicopters were scheduled to be received over the next three years.

=== Morocco ===
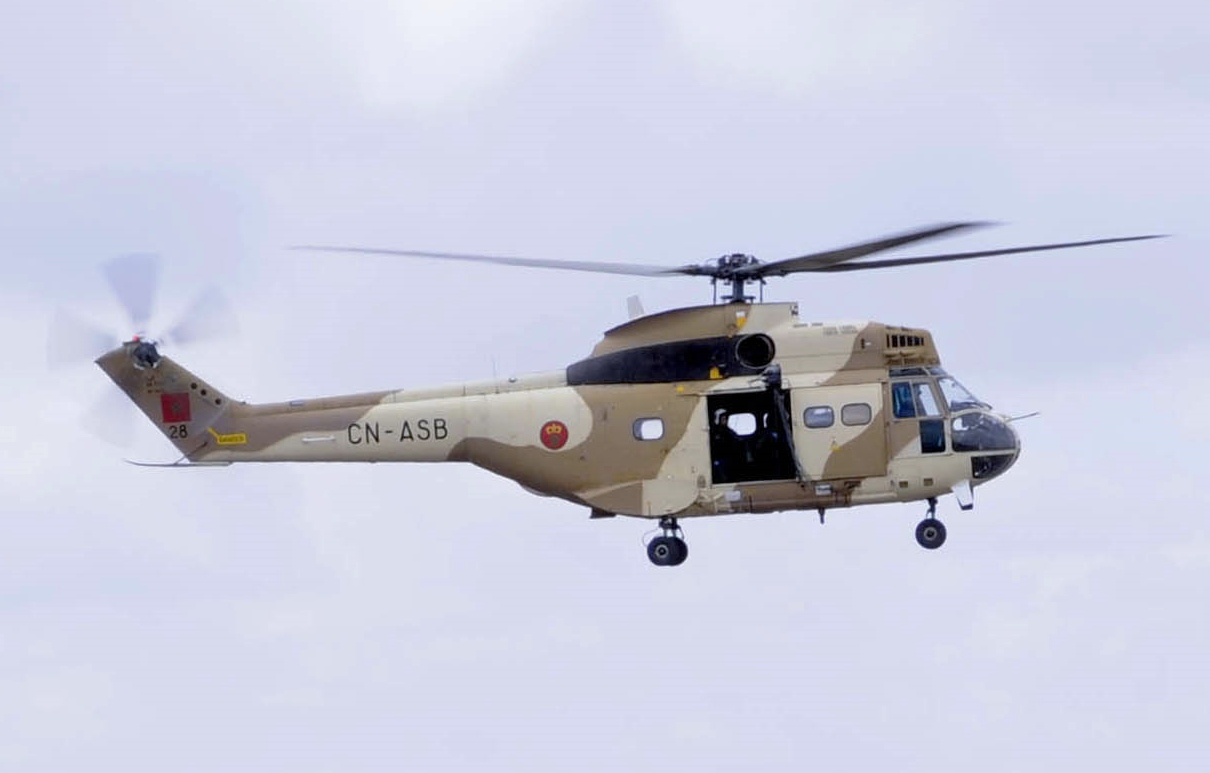
Moroccan Puma, 2012

In 1974, Morocco made an agreement with France for the purchase of 40 Puma helicopters for their armed forces. During the 1970s and 1980s, Moroccan Pumas saw combat service against Polisario Front separatists and helped exert greater control over the Western Sahara region; use of air power by Moroccan forces was severely curtailed after several aircraft were lost or damaged due to the presence of Soviet-provided 2K12 Kub anti-aircraft missiles in rebel hands in the early 1980s.

In October 2007, as part of a €2 billion deal between Morocco and France, a total of 25 Moroccan Pumas are to undergo extensive modernisation and upgrades.

=== Portugal ===
In 1969, Portugal emerged as an early export customer for the Puma, ordering 12 of the helicopters for the Portuguese Air Force; Portugal would also be the first country to employ the Pumas in combat operations during the Portuguese Colonial War; the type was used operationally to complement the smaller Alouette III helicopter fleet during the Angola and Mozambican wars of independence, the type had the advantages of greater autonomy and transport capacity over other operated helicopters.

During the 1980s, Portugal engaged in an illicit arrangement with South Africa in order to circumvent a United Nations embargo being enforced upon South Africa under which France had refused to provide upgrades and spares for South Africa's own Puma fleet. In the secretive deal, Portugal ordered more powerful engines and new avionics with the public intention of employing them on its own Pumas, however many of the components were diverted via a Zaire-based front company to South African defense firm Armscorp, where they were used to overhaul, upgrade and rebuild the existing Pumas, ultimately resulting in the Atlas Oryx; the Portuguese Pumas also received significant upgrades which were paid for under the terms of the agreement.

In 2006, the Portuguese Air Force began receiving deliveries of the AgustaWestland AW101 Merlin, a larger and more capable helicopter, replacing the aging Puma fleet.

Starting in 2007, Portugal has been offering to sell eight of its withdrawn Pumas, they were still on sale by 2015.

=== South Africa ===
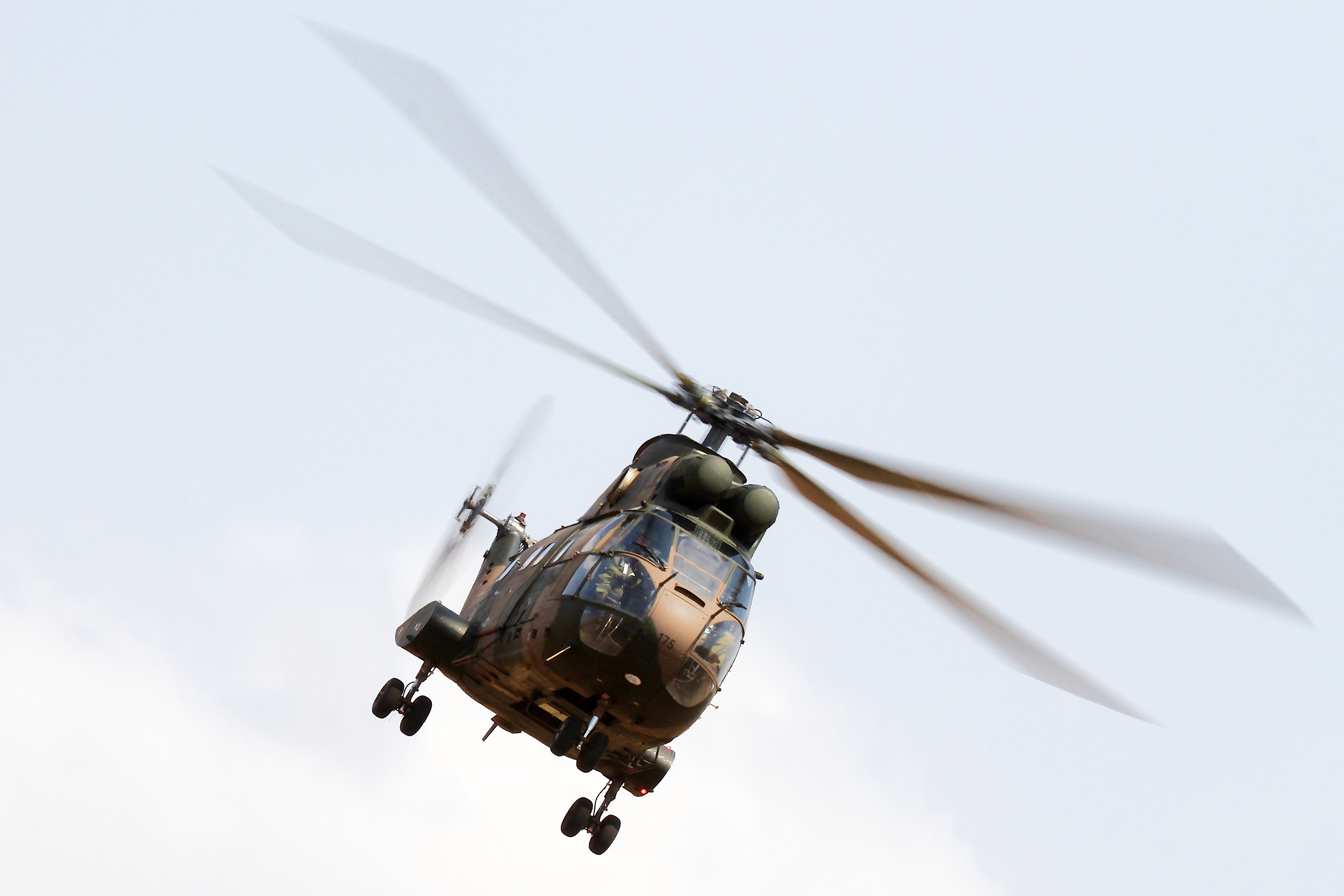
South African Air Force Puma, 2011

From 1972 onwards, Pumas operated by the SAAF were deployed on extended operations in South West Africa and Angola during the Border War. The Puma was involved in normal trooping; rapid deployment during "follow up" operations; acting as radio relays; evacuation of casualties; rescuing downed aircrew; insertion of Special Forces; and large scale cross border operations such as Savannah, Uric, Protea, Super, and Modular. The majority of South African Puma acquisitions, including of spare parts, were made in advance of an anticipated United Nations embargo that was applied in 1977. South Africa subsequently upgraded many of its Pumas, eventually arriving at the derived indigenous Atlas Oryx; external assistance and components were obtained via secretive transactions involving Portugal during the arms embargo era.

In December 1979, South Africa's government acknowledged the presence of its military forces operating in Rhodesia; Pumas were routinely used in support of the South African Army's ground forces. In June 1980, 20 Pumas accompanied a force of 8,000 troops during a South African invasion of Angola in pursuit of nationalist SWAPO fighters. In 1982, the government confirmed that 15 servicemen had been killed when a South African Puma was downed by SWAPO forces, it was one of the worst losses suffered in a single incident in the conflict.

During the 1990s, clandestine efforts to purchase surplus SAAF Pumas were made by then-President Pascal Lissouba of the Republic of Congo, most likely intended for use in the Congolese Civil War. When the cruise ship MTS Oceanos sank off the Wild Coast of South Africa in 1991, as many as 13 Pumas played crucial roles in the rescue efforts, winching 225 survivors to safety during bad weather conditions.

=== United Kingdom ===
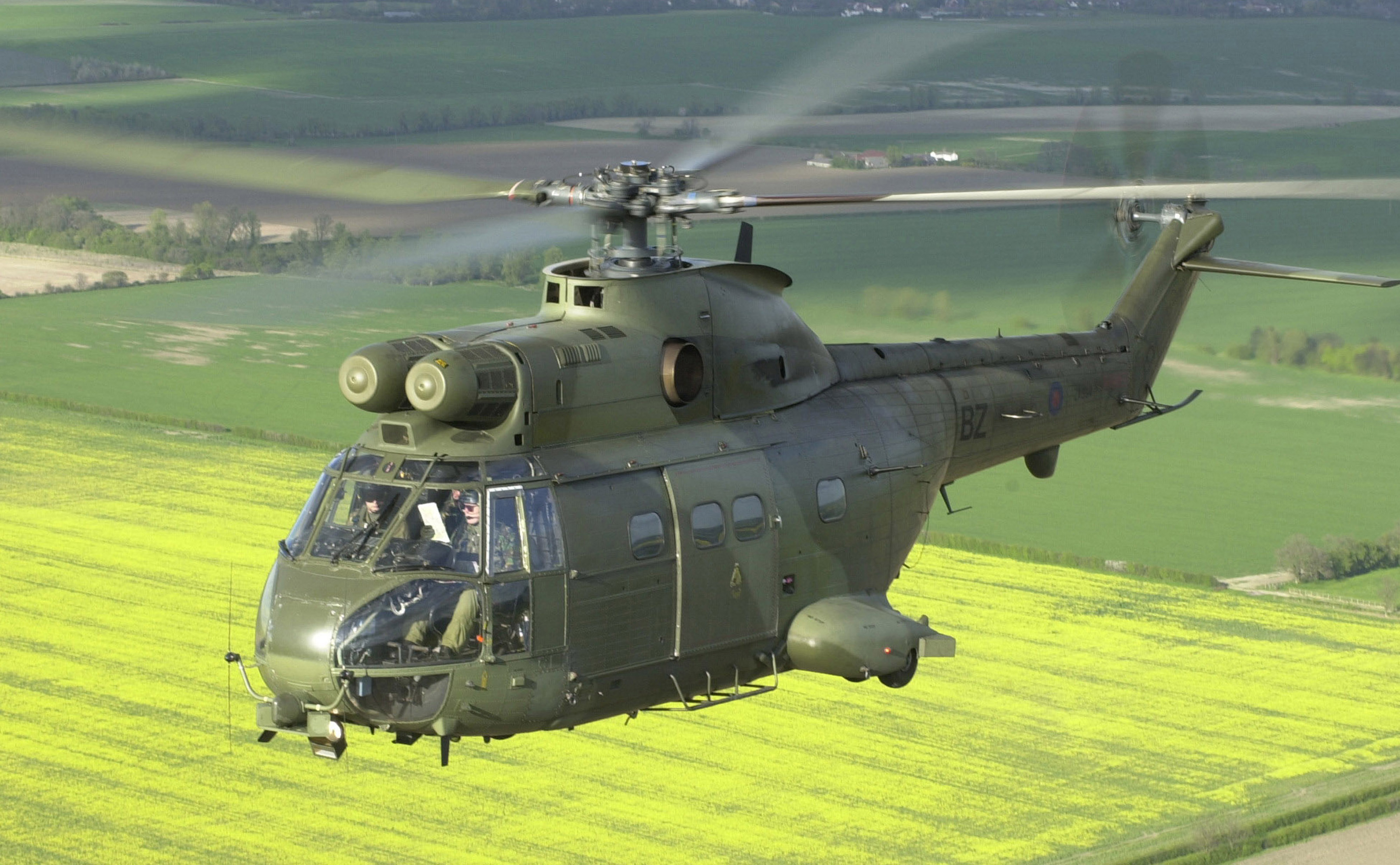
An RAF Puma HC1 in flight, 2012

The first two Pumas for the Royal Air Force were delivered on 29 January 1971, with the first operational squadron (33 Squadron) forming at RAF Odiham on 14 June 1971. The RAF would order a total of 48 Puma HC Mk 1 for transport duties; during the Falklands War, an additional SA 330J formerly operated by Argentine Naval Prefecture was captured by British forces and shipped back to Great Britain and used as an RAF static training aid for several years. This SA 330J was later refurbished by Westland using parts from damaged RAF Puma XW215 and put into RAF service after a lengthy rebuild as ZE449. The Puma became a common vehicle for British special forces, such as the SAS, and has been described as being "good for covert tasks".

Between the early 1970s and the 1990s, RAF Pumas were normally based at RAF Odiham (33 Squadron and 240 OCU), RAF Gutersloh (230 Squadron) and No. 1563 Flight RAF at RAF Belize. During The Troubles, it was also common for a detachment to be based at RAF Aldergrove in Northern Ireland. In 1994, 230 Squadron relocated to RAF Aldergrove to provide a permanent presence to augment the Westland Wessex of 72 Squadron. In 2009, 230 Squadron relocated to RAF Benson together with 33 Squadron from RAF Odiham.

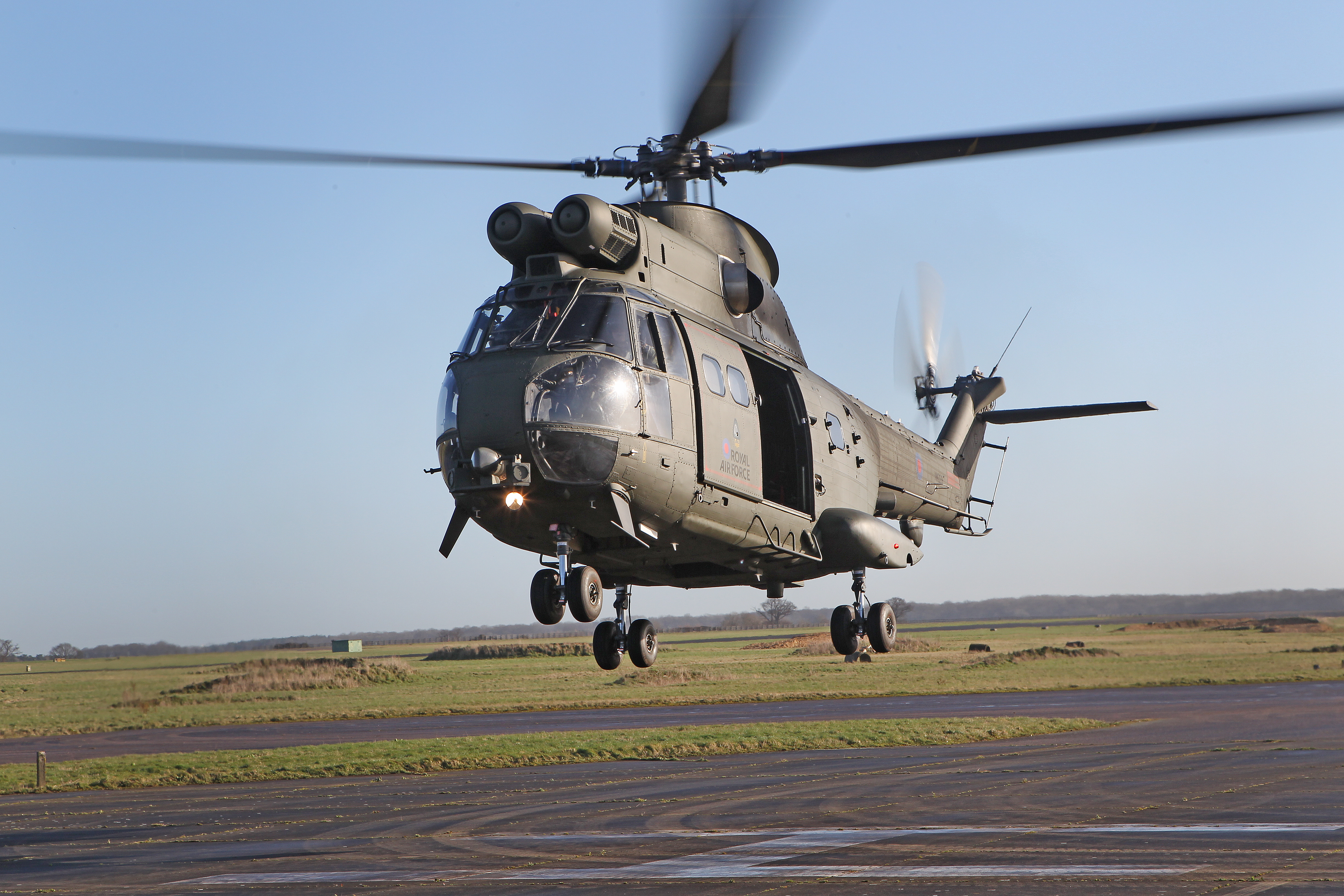
An upgraded RAF Puma HC2, 2014

Royal Air Force Pumas have also seen active service in Venezuela, Iraq, Yugoslavia, and Zaire. Britain has frequently dispatched Pumas on disaster relief and humanitarian missions, such as during the 2000 Mozambique flood and the 1988 Jamaican flash flood; and to conduct peacekeeping operations in regions such as Zimbabwe and the Persian Gulf.

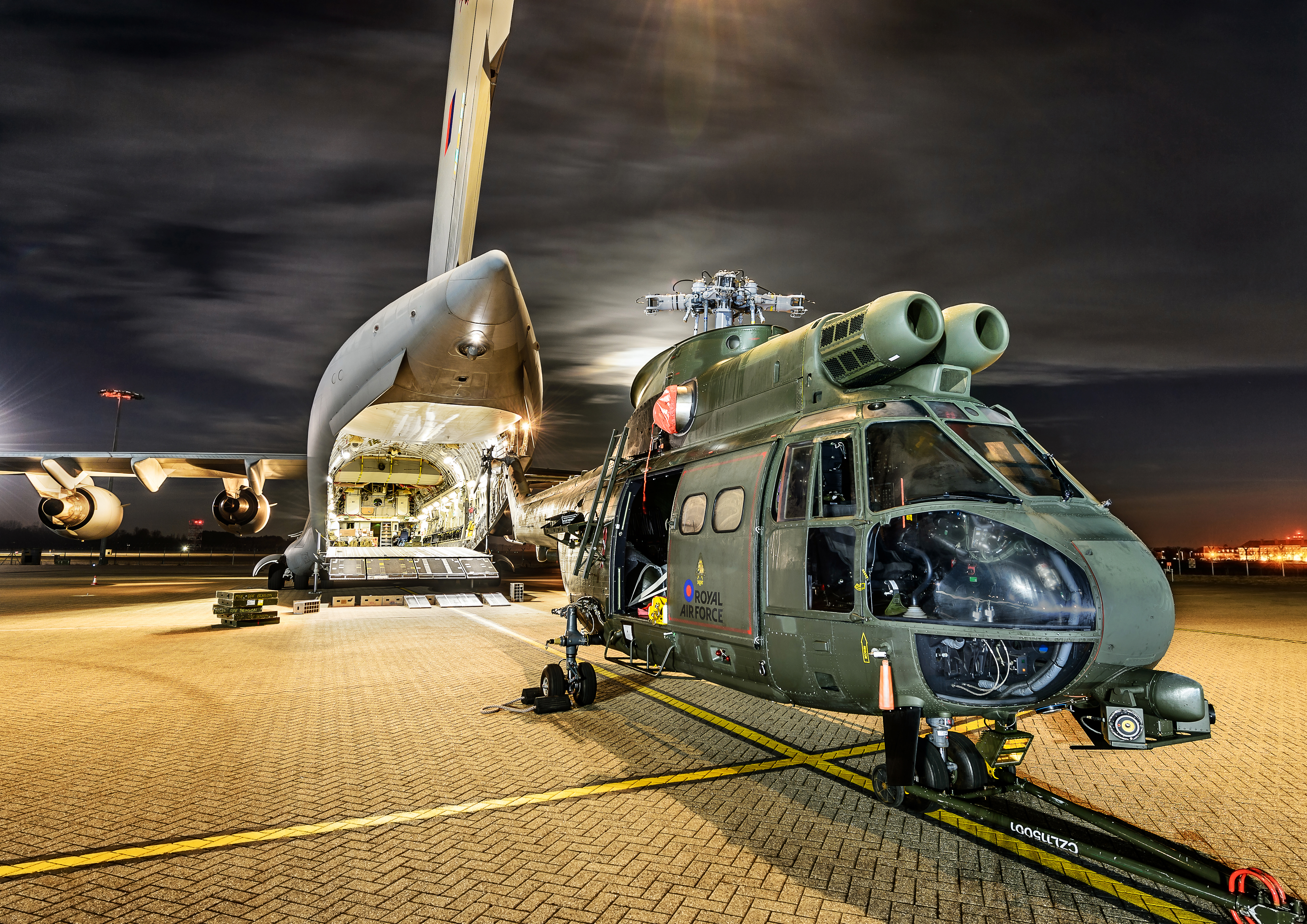
RAF Puma Mk2 being loaded onto an RAF C-17

During the climax of the First Gulf War, a joint force of Pumas from 230 and 33 Squadrons proved decisive in rapidly mobilizing and deploying troops to prevent Iraqi troops from sabotaging the Rumaila oil field. From the beginning of the Iraq War, between 2003 and 2009, RAF Pumas would be used to provide troop mobility across the theatre. On 15 April 2007, two RAF Pumas collided during a special forces mission close to Baghdad, Iraq. In November 2007, a Puma crashed during an anti-insurgent operation in Iraq; an inquest found the cause to be pilot error primarily, however the Ministry of Defence (MoD) was criticised for failing to equip RAF Pumas with night vision goggles and inadequate maintenance checks compromising safety, these shortcomings were addressed following the incident.

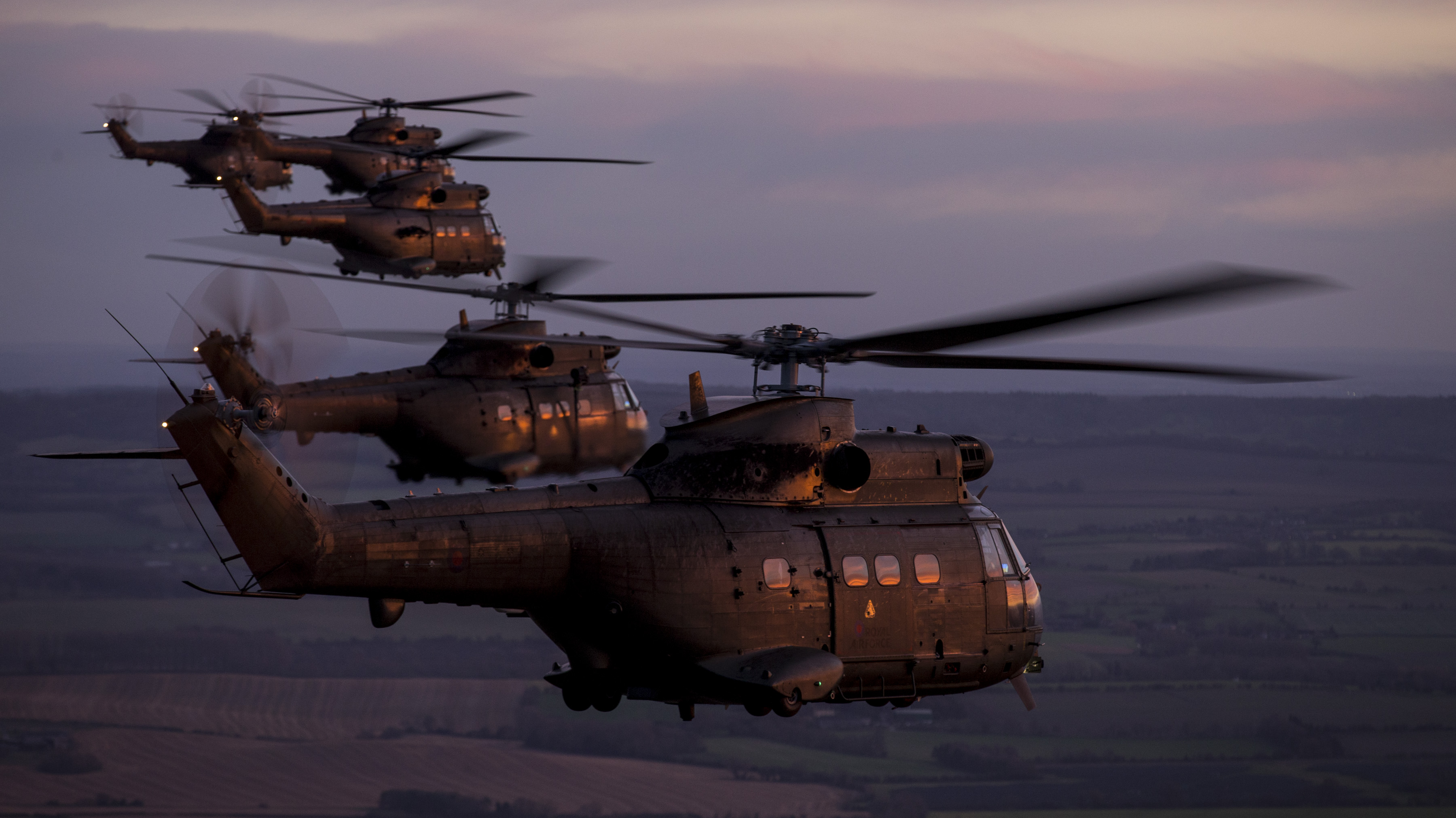
Pumas in formation for Exercise Wessex Storm, 2020

In 2002, six ex-South African SA 330L were purchased by Britain to extend the type's service life. An extensive upgrade programme saw the first Puma HC Mk2 enter service in late 2012 and completion in early 2014, permitting the RAF's Pumas to stay in service until 2025. In 2008, it was planned for 30 Pumas to be upgraded, this was subsequently cut to 22, and was later revised upwards for a total of 24 HC Mk2 Pumas. Upgrades include the adoption of two Turbomeca Makila engines, new gearboxes and tail rotors, new engine controls, digital autopilot, a flight management system, an improved defensive aids suite, and ballistic protection for both crew and passengers. The HC Mk2 Puma can transport double the payload over three times the range of its predecessor, and has been deployed for tactical troop transport, fast contingent combat, and humanitarian missions.

The RAF ceased operating Pumas on 31 March 2025, the replacement rotorcraft being procured under the New Medium Helicopter programme.

=== Private military companies ===
The American private military company EP Aviation is known to have operated numerous Pumas in Afghanistan.

=== Civil ===
One of the largest and prominent operators of the type was Bristow Helicopters, where the Puma was regularly used for off shore operations over the North Sea. During the 1970s, Bristow had sought to begin replacing their Sikorsky S-61 helicopters, and the Puma was selected after a highly competitively-priced bid had been made by Aerospatiale; Puma G-BFSV was the first of the type to enter service with Bristow. From 1979 onwards, the Puma formed the mainstay of the Bristow fleet; the type took over the duties of Bristow's retiring Westland Wessex helicopters in 1981. In 1982, Bristow opted to supplement their then-total fleet of 11 SA 330J Pumas via the introduction the more powerful Super Puma.

The American operator Erickson Inc. has operated at least four Pumas; they have been used under contract for Vertical replenishment (VERTREP) to the United States Fifth Fleet and United States Seventh Fleet.

== Variants ==
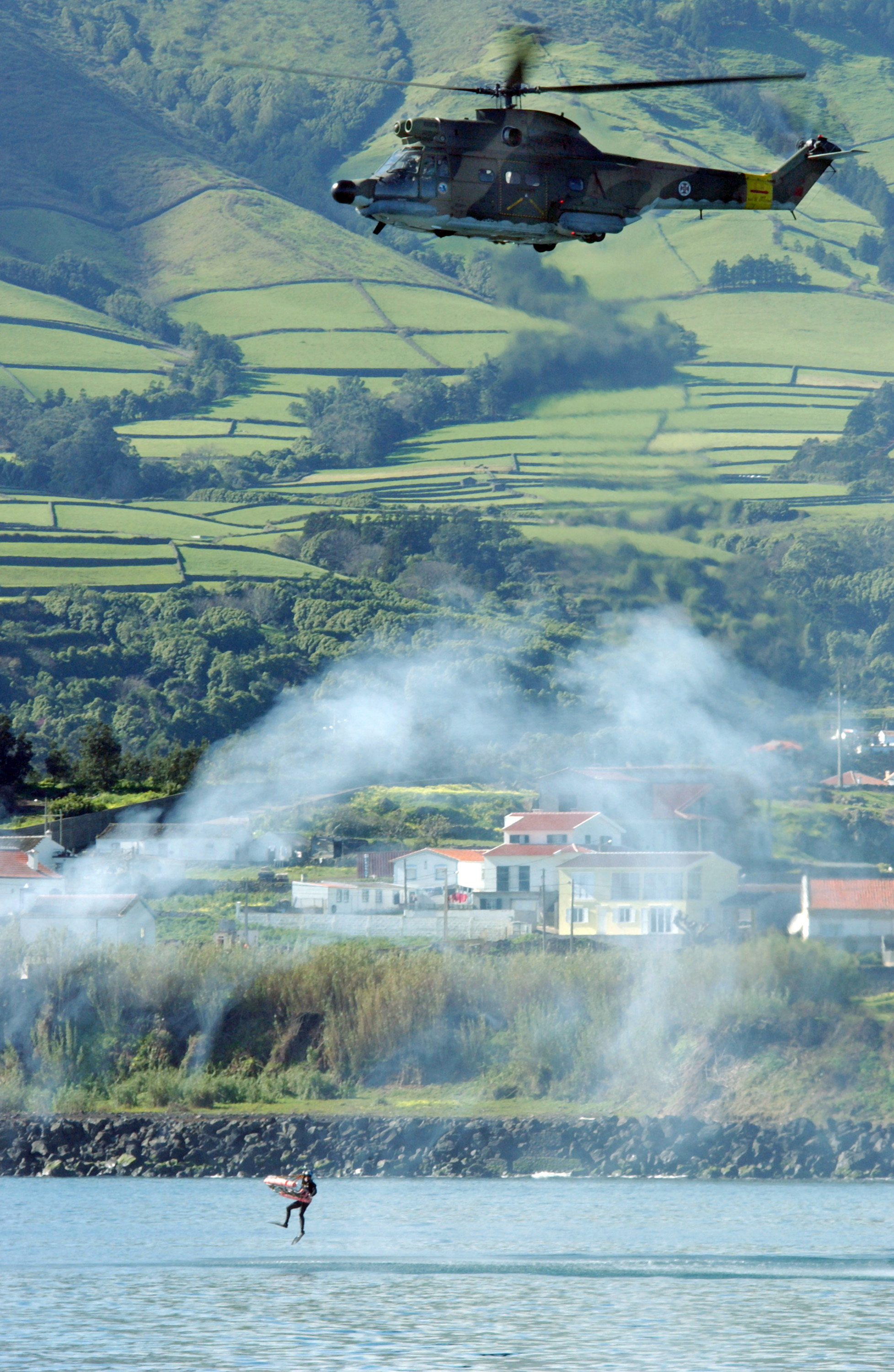
Portuguese Air Force Puma during a Space Shuttle recovery exercise at Lajes Air Base, Azores in 2004

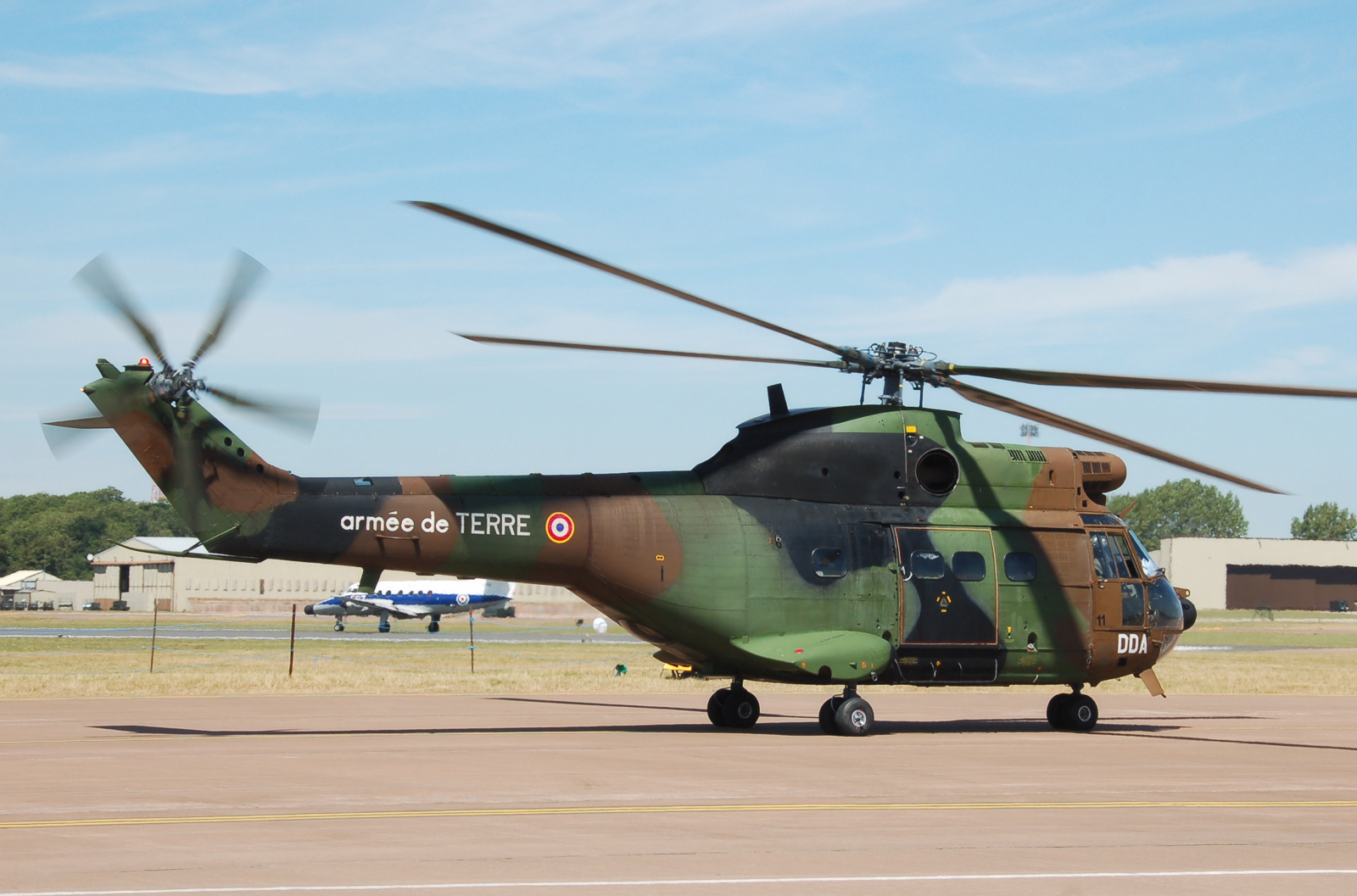
French Army Puma at RIAT 2010

External videos
- French Army Puma during an exercise
- In-cockpit view of a SA 330J flight
- Spanish Air Force SA 330 Puma performing at an airshow in 2011

=== Aérospatiale versions ===
SA 330A
Prototypes, originally called "Alouette IV".
SA 330B
Initial production version for the French Army Light Aviation. Powered by 884 kW (1,185 hp) Turbomeca Turmo IIIC4 engines. 132 purchased by France.
SA 330 Orchidée
SA 330 modified to carry an Orchidée battlefield surveillance radar system with a rotating underfuselage antenna, for the French Army. One demonstrator was built, flying in 1986. The Orchidée programme was cancelled in 1990, but the prototype rushed back into service in 1991 to serve in the Gulf War, leading to production of a similar system based on the Eurocopter Cougar.
SA 330C
Initial export production version. Powered by 1,044 kW (1,400 hp) Turbomeca Turmo IVB engines.
SA.330E
Version produced by Westland Helicopters for the RAF under the designation Puma HC Mk. 1.
SA.330F
Initial civilian export production version with Turbomeca Turmo IIIC4 turboshaft engines.
SA.330G
Upgraded civilian version with 1175 kW (1,575 hp) Turbomeca Turmo IVC engines.
SA.330H
Upgraded French Army and export version with Turbomeca Turmo IVC engines and composite main rotor blades. Designated SA 330Ba by the French Air and Space Force. All surviving French Army SA 330Bs converted to this standard.
SA.330J
Upgraded civil transport version with composite rotor blades and with higher maximum takeoff weight.
SA.330L
Upgraded version for "hot and high" conditions. Military equivalent to civil SA.330J. Designated CH-33 in Brazilian service.
SA.330S
Upgraded SA 330L (themselves converted from SA 330C) version for the Portuguese Air Force. Powered by Turbomeca Makila engines.
SA.330SM
Lebanese converted gunship version by mounting on hardened side-swivel mounts a single ADEN Mk 4/5 30mm revolver cannon on a modified pod and a pair of SNEB 68mm rocket launchers on each side.
SA.330Z
Prototype with "fenestron" tail rotor.
SA.331 Puma Makila
Engine test-bed for the AS.332 Super Puma series, powered by two Turbomeca Makila engines

=== Versions by other manufacturers ===
Atlas Aircraft Corporation Oryx
Remanufactured and upgraded SA 330 Puma built for the South African Air Force.
IPTN NAS 330J
Version that was assembled by IPTN of Indonesia under the local designation NAS 330J and the Aerospatiale designation of SA 330J. Eleven units were produced.
IAR 330
Licence-built version of the SA 330 Puma manufactured by Industria Aeronautică Română of Romania. Designated as the SA 330L by Aerospatiale.
IAR-330 Puma SOCAT
24 modified for antitank warfare.
IAR-330 Puma Naval
3 modified for the Romanian Navy, using the SOCAT avionics.
Westland Puma HC Mk 1
SA 330E equivalent assembled by Westland Helicopters for the RAF, first flown on 25 November 1970. Several similarities to the SA 330B employed by the French Armed Forces. The RAF placed an initial order for 40 Pumas in 1967, with a further eight attrition replacement aircraft in 1979.
Airbus Helicopters Puma HC.Mk 2
Modified Puma HC Mk1s, total of 24 upgraded with more powerful Turbomeca Makila 1A1 engines, a glass cockpit and new avionics, secure communications and improved self-protection equipment.

== Operators ==
=== Current operators ===
Brazil

- Brazilian Air Force

Chile

- Chilean Army

Democratic Republic of the Congo

- Democratic Congo Air Force

Ecuador

- Ecuadorian Army

France

- French Air and Space Force
  - Cayenne – Félix Eboué Airport, French Guiana
    - ET 00.068
  - Djibouti–Ambouli International Airport, Djibouti
    - ET 00.088
  - La Tontouta International Airport, New Caledonia
    - ET 00.052
  - Solenzara Air Base, Haute-Corse, France
    - EH 01.044
- French Army Light Aviation

Gabon

- Military of Gabon
  - Léon-Mba International Airport, Libreville
    - Escadrille Aérienne Transport

Guinea

- Guinea Air Force

Kenya

- Kenya Air Force
  - Moi Air Base, Nairobi City County
    - Helicopter Squadron

Kuwait

- Kuwait Air Force

Lebanon

- Lebanese Air Force
  - Wujah Al Hajar Air Base, Hamat
    - 9 Squadron

Malawi

- Malawi Army

Morocco

- Royal Moroccan Air Force
  - First Air Base, Rabat-Salé-Kénitra
    - Escadrons de Manoeuvres Tactiques

Pakistan

- Pakistan Air Force
- Pakistan Army Aviation Corps
  - Multan International Airport, Punjab
    - 24th Army Aviation Squadron
  - Qasim Airbase, Dhamial
    - 13th Army Aviation Squadron
    - 28th Army Aviation Squadron

Romania

- Romanian Air Force (See IAR 330)
  - 71st Air Base, Cluj County
    - Escadrila 712
    - Escadrila 713
  - 90th Airlift Base, Ilfov County
    - Escadrila 903
  - 95th Air Base, Bacău County
    - Escadrila 952
- Romanian Navy (See IAR 330)
  - Tuzla Aerodrome, Constanța County
    - Grupul 256

Ukraine

- Ukrainian Air Force

=== Former operators ===
Algeria

- Algerian Air Force

Argentina

- Argentine Army
- Argentine Coast Guard

Belgium

- Gendarmerie

Cameroon

- Cameroon Air Force

Ethiopia

- Ethiopian Air Force

Indonesia

- Indonesian Air Force
  - Atang Senjaya Air Force Base, West Java
    - Wing Udara 4 – Skadron Udara 8 (Retired on 30 December 2023)

Iraq

- Iraqi Air Force

Ireland

- Irish Air Corps

Mexico

- Mexican Air Force

Nigeria

- Nigerian Air Force

Oman

- Royal Air Force of Oman

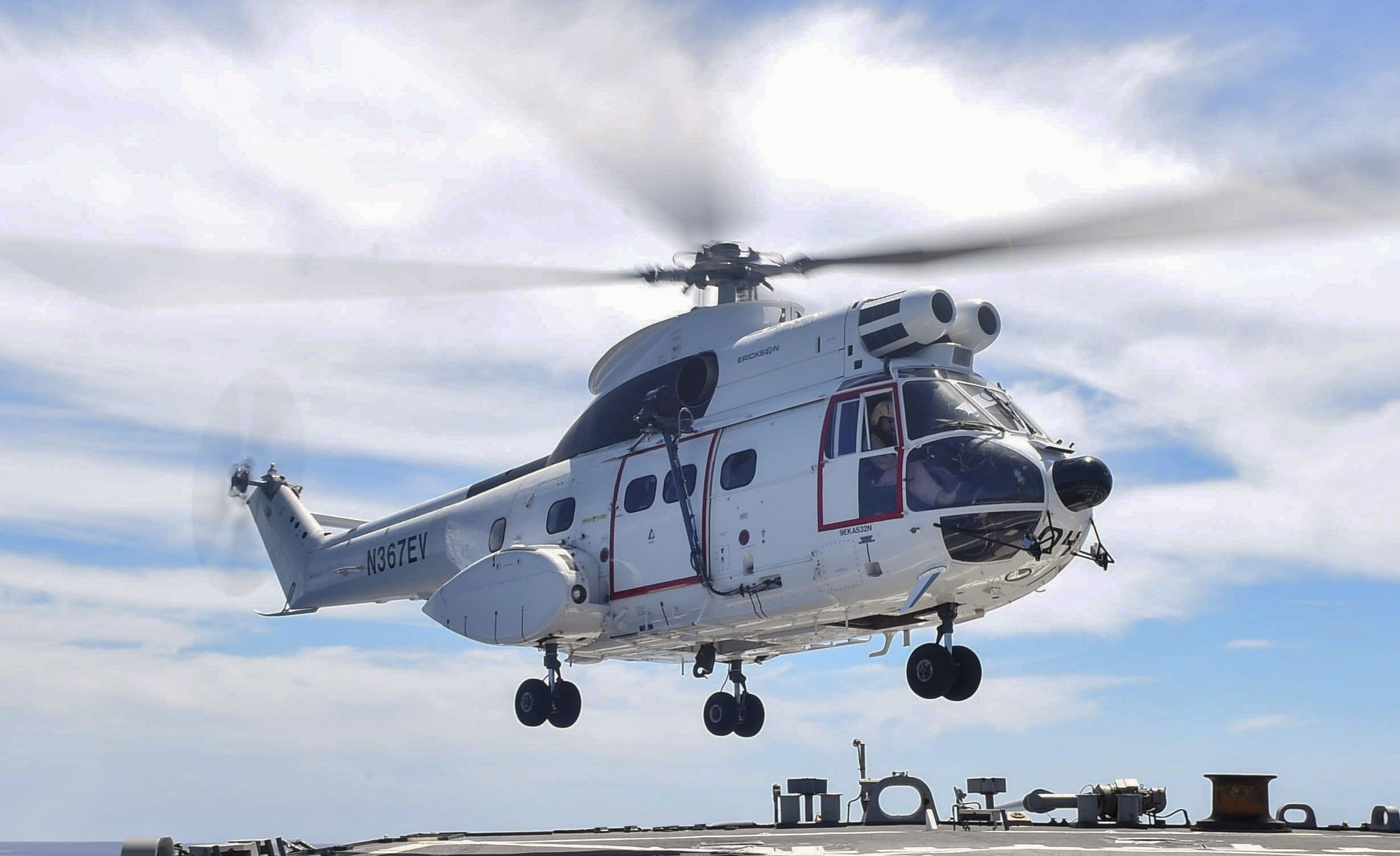
A contracted Puma resupplies USS Benfold of the US Navy Sealift Command

Philippines

- Philippine Air Force - 2 units were purchased in 1979 by Central Bank of the Philippines for the Philippine Air Force VIP 700th Special Mission Wing

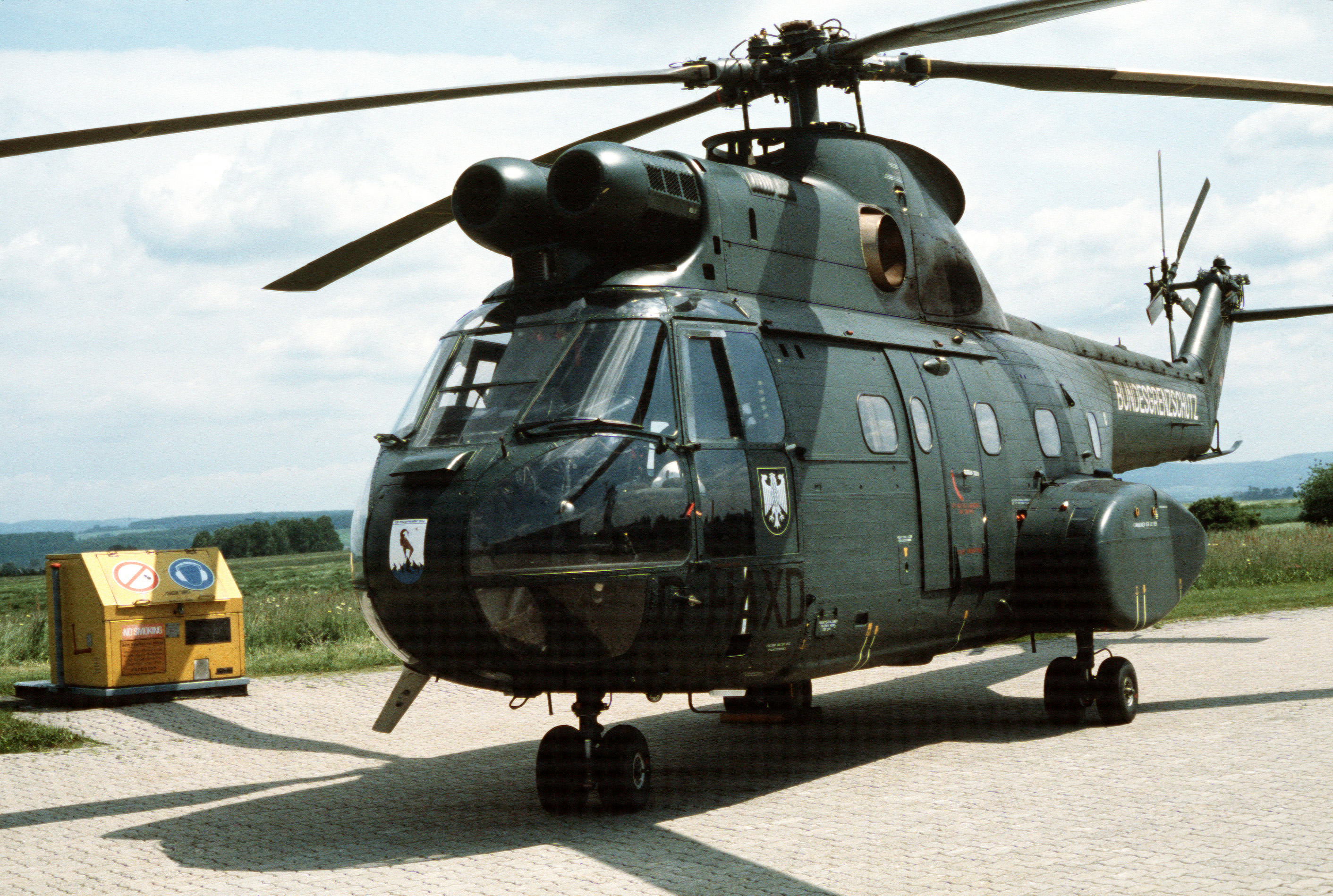
A SA 330 Puma formerly used by West Germany's Bundesgrenzschutz (border police).

Portugal

- Portuguese Air Force

Senegal

- Senegalese Air Force

South Africa

- South African Air Force

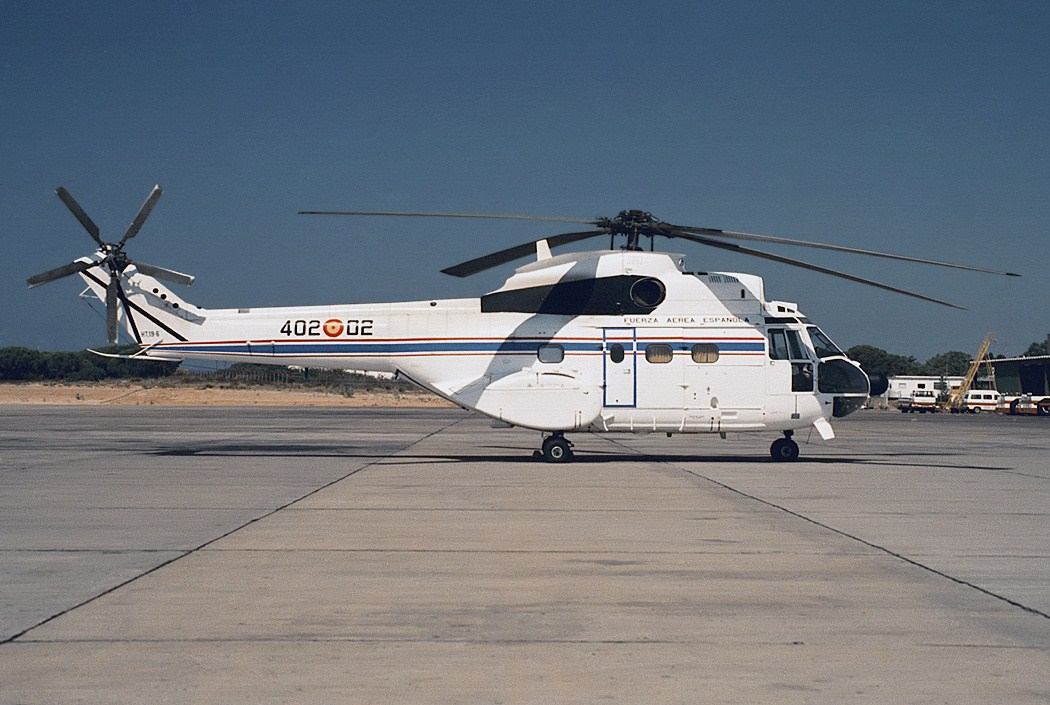
Spanish SA 330J in 1989

Spain

- Spanish Air and Space Force
  - 402 Escuadrón in Ala 48

Togo

- Togolese Air Force

Tunisia

- Tunisian Air Force

United Arab Emirates

- United Arab Emirates Air Force

United Kingdom

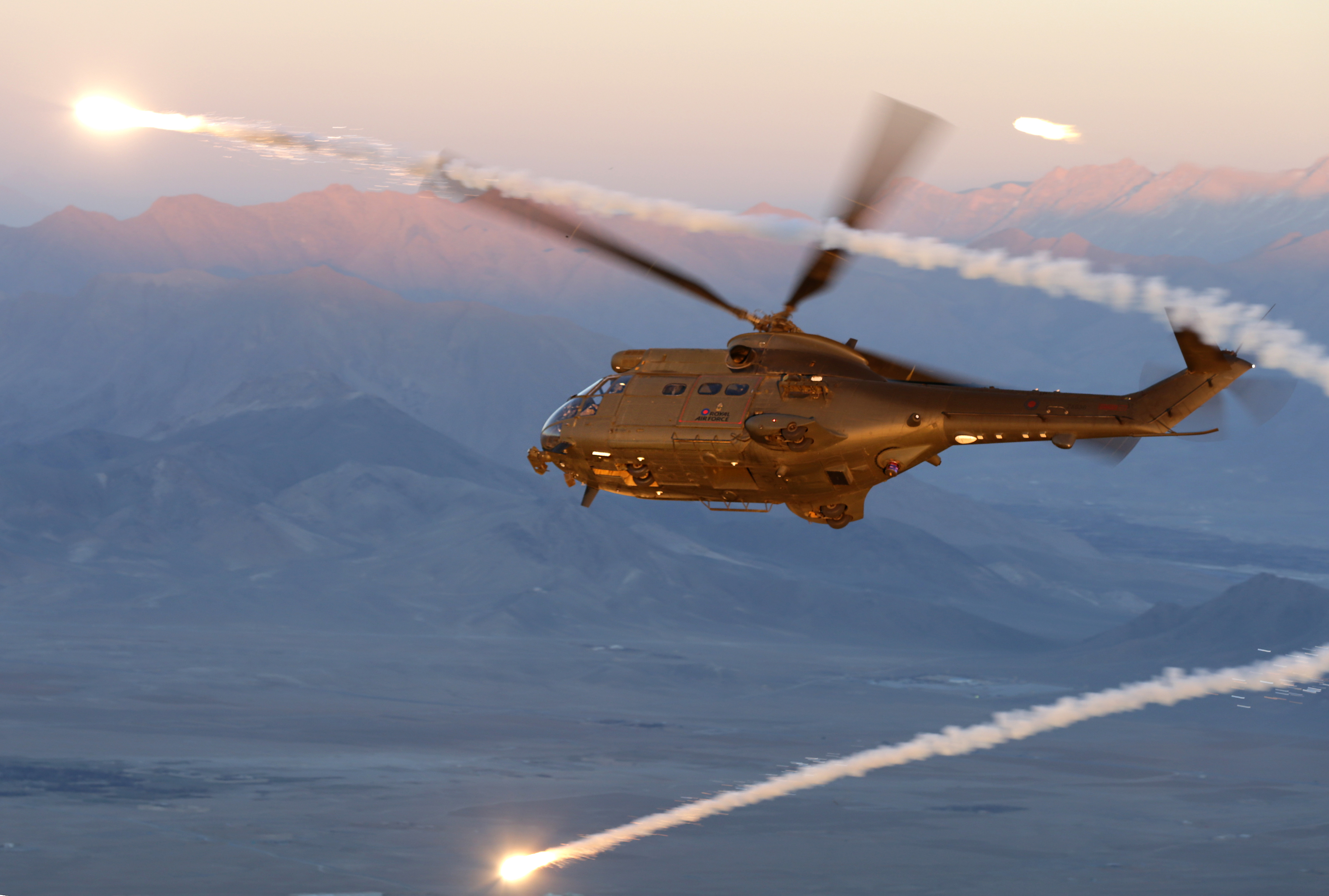
- A Puma HC2 of No. 33 Squadron using flares over Afghanistan while deployed in the country as part of Operation Toral, 2015.
  Royal Air Force
  - RAF Odiham, Hampshire, England
    - No. 27(R) Squadron (OCU) (1993–1998)
    - No. 240 Operational Conversion Unit (1971–1993)
  - RAF Aldergrove, County Antrim, Northern Ireland
    - No. 72 Squadron (1997–2002)
  - RAF Akrotiri, Cyprus
    - No. 84 Squadron (2023–2025)
  - RAF Benson, Oxfordshire, England
    - No. 22 Squadron (OEU) (2020–2025)
    - No. 33 Squadron (1971–2025)
    - No. 230 Squadron (1971–2022)
    - No. 28 Squadron (OCU) (2015–2025)
  - Medicina Lines, Brunei
    - No. 1563 Flight (1971–1993; 2004–2009; 2022–2023)
    - No. 230 Squadron (2023–2025)

== Notable accidents and incidents ==
- 29 March 2022 – Eight UN peacekeepers (six Pakistanis, a Russian and a Serb), part of the United Nations Stabilization Mission in the Democratic Republic of the Congo were killed in a crash of a Puma helicopter operated by the Pakistan Army Aviation Corps while on a reconnaissance mission in the troubled eastern Democratic Republic of Congo. Cause of the crash is yet to be ascertained.

== Specifications (SA 330H Puma) ==
Orthographically projected diagram of the SA330 Puma Line Drawing

Data from Jane's All The World's Aircraft 1976–77

General characteristics

- Crew: 3
- Capacity: 16 passengers
- Length: 18.15 m (59 ft 6½ in)
- Rotor diameter: 15.00 m (49 ft 2½ in)
- Height: 5.14 m (16 ft 10½ in)
- Disc area: 177.0 m^{2} (1,905 ft^{2})
- Empty weight: 3,536 kg (7,795 lb)
- Max takeoff weight: 7,000 kg (15,430 lb)
- Powerplant: 2× Turbomeca Turmo IVC turboshafts, 1,175 kW (1,575 hp) each

Performance

- Never exceed speed: 273 km/h (147 knots, 169 mph)
- Maximum speed: 257 km/h (138 knots, 159 mph)
- Cruise speed: 248 km/h (134 knots, 154 mph) econ cruise
- Range: 580 km (313 nm, 360 mi)
- Service ceiling: 4,800 m (15,750 ft)
- Rate of climb: 7.1 m/s (1,400 ft/min)

Armament

- Guns:
  - Coaxial 7.62 mm (0.30 in) machine guns
  - Side-firing 20 mm (0.787 in) cannon
  - Various others

== Family tree ==
  - SA330 Puma – (France)
    - Atlas Oryx – (South Africa)
      - Denel Rooivalk – (South Africa)
    - IAR 330 – (Romania)
    - IPTN NAS 330J (Indonesia)
    - Westland Puma HC.1 (United Kingdom)
  - Eurocopter AS332 Super Puma – (France) (H215 Super Puma)
    - Eurocopter AS532 Cougar – (France) (H215M Caracal)
    - KAI KUH-1 Surion – (South Korea)
  - Eurocopter EC725 – (France) (H225M Caracal)
    - Eurocopter EC225 Super Puma – (France) (EC225 Super Puma Mk2)

== See also ==
Related development

- Atlas Oryx
- Denel Rooivalk
- Eurocopter AS332 Super Puma
- Eurocopter AS532 Cougar
- Eurocopter EC225 Super Puma Mk II+
- Eurocopter EC725 Super Cougar
- IAR 330

Aircraft of comparable role, configuration, and era

- Mil Mi-8
- NH 90

Related lists

- List of rotorcraft
