= Escadron de Transport 55 Ouessant =

Transport Squadron 55 Ouessant
- Escadron de Transport 55 Ouessant
- Country: France
- Branch: French Air and Space Force
- Type: Military transport aircraft
- Role: Transport
- Garrison/HQ: Léon-Mba International Airport

Aircraft flown
- Transport: Eurocopter Fennec

Escadron de Transport 55 Ouessant is a French Air and Space Force squadron located at Léon-Mba International Airport, Libreville, Gabon which operates the Eurocopter Fennec.

In the 1970s ETOM 55 (Escadron de Transport d'Outre Mer 55) operated the Nord Noratlas transport aircraft from Dakar, Senegal.

== See also ==
- List of French Air and Space Force aircraft squadrons
