= Escadron de Ravitaillement en Vol 4/31 Sologne =

Air Refueling Squadron 4/31 Sologne
- Escadron de Ravitaillement en Vol 4/31 Sologne
- Active: October 4, 2019 - June 30, 2025 (as ERV 4/31 Sologne)
- Country: France
- Branch: Armée de l'air et de l'espace
- Type: Aerial refueling
- Role: Air Refueling Squadron
- Garrison/HQ: BA 125 Istres-Le Tubé Air Base

Aircraft flown
- Tanker: Boeing C-135FR Stratolifter / Boeing KC-135RG Stratotanker

Escadron de Ravitaillement en Vol 4/31 Sologne was a French Air and Space Force (Armée de l'air et de l'espace) Air Refueling Squadron located at Istres-Le Tubé Air Base, Bouches-du-Rhône, France which operated the Boeing C-135FR Stratolifter until December 2023, and the Boeing KC-135RG Stratotanker until June 2025

== Denominations ==
- Escadron de Ravitaillement en Vol (ERV) 4/94 Sologne (1966 - 1976)
- Escadron de Ravitaillement en Vol 2/93 Sologne (1976 - 1993)
- Escadron de Ravitaillement en Vol 4/31 Sologne (2019 - 2025)

== Escadrilles ==
Escadrilles from 1966 to 1993

- 1st Escadrille : BR 44
- 2nd Escadrille : LET 465

From 2019 to 2025

- 1st Escadrille : LET 465
- 2nd Escadrille : SPA Bi 54

== Airbases ==
- Base Aérienne 702 Avord (1966 - 1993)
- Base Aérienne 125 Istres-Le Tubé (2019 - 2025)

== Aircraft flown ==
- Boeing C-135F Stratotanker (1966 - 1988)
- Boeing C-135FR Stratotanker (1988 - 1993 / 2019 - 2023)
- Boeing KC-135RG Stratotanker (2019 - 2025)

== See also ==
- List of French Air and Space Force aircraft squadrons
