= Escadron de Ravitaillement en Vol et de Transport Stratégique 1/31 Bretagne =

Strategic Air Refueling and Transport Squadron 1/31 Bretagne
- Escadron de Ravitaillement en Vol et de Transport Stratégique 1/31 Bretagne
- Active: Since October 4, 2019 (as ERVTS 1/31)
- Country: France
- Branch: Armée de l'air et de l'espace
- Type: Aerial refueling
- Role: Strategic Air Refueling and Transport
- Garrison/HQ: Istres-Le Tubé Air Base

Aircraft flown
- Tanker: Airbus A330 Phénix

Escadron de Ravitaillement en Vol et de Transport Stratégique 1/31 Bretagne is a French Air and Space Force (Armée de l'air et de l'espace) Strategic Air Refueling and Transport Squadron located at Istres-Le Tubé Air Base, Bouches-du-Rhône, France which operates the Airbus A330 MRTT Phénix.

== Escadrilles ==
Escadrilles (flights) used until 2012 :

- 1st Escadrille : Rennes (From January 1, 1941 to June 29, 2012)
- 2nd Escadrille : Nantes (From January 1, 1941 to June 29, 2012)
- 3rd Escadrille : SAL 22 (Since August 1, 1996)

Since June 29, 2012 :

- 1st Escadrille : BR 108
- 2nd Escadrille : VR 25
- 3rd Escadrille : BR 129
- (4th Escadrille : SAL 22, from August 1, 1996 to 2020)

== Previous denominations ==
- Détachement Permanent des Forces Aériennes au Tchad (DPFAT) : January 1, 1941 - January 1, 1942
- Groupe Bretagne : January 1, 1942 - June 1, 1943
- Groupe de Bombardement Moyen (GBM) II/20 Bretagne : June 1, 1943 - June 1, 1944
- Groupe de Bombardement (GB) II/20 Bretagne : June 1, 1944 - March 1, 1946
- Groupe de Transport (GT) II/20 Bretagne : March 1, 1946 - July 1, 1947
- Groupe de Transport I/63 Bretagne : July 1, 1947 - February 1, 1965
- Escadron de Bombardement (EB) 2/91 Bretagne : February 1, 1965 - July 4, 1996
- Escadron de Ravitaillement en Vol (ERV) 93 Bretagne : August 1, 1996 - September 1, 2004
- Groupe de Ravitaillement en Vol (GRV) 93 Bretagne : September 1, 2004 - September 1, 2009
- Groupe de Ravitaillement en Vol 2/91 Bretagne : September 1, 2009 - October 4, 2019

== Aircraft flown ==
- Martin 167 (1941-1944)
- Potez 540 (1941-1944)
- Potez 29 (1941-1944)
- Westland Lysander (1941-1944)
- Bristol Blenheim (1942-1944)
- Martin B-26 Marauder (1943-1947)
- Amiot AAC.1 Toucan (1947-1955)
- Nord N.2501 Noratlas (1955-1965)
- Dassault Mirage IV A (1965-1986)
- Dassault Mirage IV P (1986-1996)
- Boeing C-135FR Stratotanker (1996-2019)
- Boeing KC-135R(G) (1996-2019, 3 loaned from 1993 to 1997, and 3 bought in 1997)

== See also ==
- List of French Air and Space Force aircraft squadrons
