= Escadron de Ravitaillement en Vol et de Transport Stratégique 2/31 Estérel =

Strategic Air-to-Air Refuelling and Transport Squadron 2/31 Esterel
- Escadron de Ravitaillement en Vol et de Transport Stratégique 02.031 Estérel
- Active: 1968 - July 11, 2023 (as ET 3/60); July 11, 2023 - (as ERVTS 2/31)
- Country: France
- Branch: French Air and Space Force
- Type: Aerial refueling and Military transport aircraft
- Role: Strategic Air Refueling and Transport
- Garrison/HQ: Istres-Le Tubé Air Base

Aircraft flown
- Transport: Airbus A330; Airbus A330 MRTT Phénix

Escadron de Ravitaillement en Vol et de Transport Stratégiques 2/31 Esterel is a French Air and Space Force squadron located at Istres-Le Tubé Air Base, Bouches-du-Rhône, France which operates the Airbus A330 (only one now, F-UJCU) and the Airbus A330 MRTT.

== Escadrilles ==
The Estérel received 3 escadrilles in 2012 :

- 1st Escadrille : BR 227
- 2nd Escadrille : F 110
- 3rd Escadrille : BR 224 (which is the EIE Airbus (Escadrille d'Instruction et d'Entraînement))

== Airbases ==
- Le Bourget and Roissy-Charles de Gaulle airports (1968 - 1974)
- Base Aérienne 107 Villacoublay-Vélizy (1974 - 1994)
- Base Aérienne 110 Créil (1994 - 2023)
- Base Aérienne 125 Istres-Le Tubé (2023 - ...)

== Denominations ==
- Escadron de Transport (ET) 3/60 Esterel (1968 - 2023)
- Escadron de Ravitaillement en Vol et de Transport Stratégiques (ERVTS) 2/31 Esterel (2023 - ...)

== Aircraft flown ==
- Douglas DC-8 55 F (1966 - 1994)
- Douglas DC-8 65 CF (1976 - 1983)
- Douglas DC-8 72 CF (1982 - 2004)
- SNCASE SE.210 Caravelle (1988 - 1992)
- Airbus A310-300 (1993 - 2021)
- Airbus A340-200 (2006 - 2020)
- Airbus A330-200 (2020 - ...)
- Airbus A330-200 MRTT (2023 - ...)

== See also ==
- List of French Air and Space Force aircraft squadrons
