= École de pilotage de l'Armée de l'air =

EPAA (Air Force Flying Training School)
- Charente, Nouvelle-Aquitaine

Site information
- Type: Training establishment
- Owner: Direction Générale de l'Armement (1956–)
- Controlled by: France (Armée de l'air)

Location
- Position in Nouvelle-Aquitaine
- Coordinates: 45.664°N 0.312°W

Site history
- Built: 1956
- In use: 1956

The École de pilotage de l'Armée de l'air (EPAA), or École de Pilotage de l'Armée de l'Air 315 Général Jarry, is the main training centre for pilots of the French Air and Space Force.

== History ==
The EPAA was formed in April 1956.

== Training ==
It is the initial pilot training school of the French Air and Space Force. The aircraft for training are the Pilatus PC-21 and the Grob G 120. The training course is about 100 hours of flying, with 30 hours on the simulator.

== Structure ==
It is situated in the Charente department of the Nouvelle-Aquitaine region.

== See also ==
- École de l'air
- L'équipe de présentation de l'armée de l'air
