= 4e Escadre de Chasse =

4^{e} Escadre de Chasse 4th Fighter Wing
- Active: August 26, 2015 - present
- Country: France
- Branch: French Air and Space Force
- Type: Fighter aircraft
- Role: Nuclear deterrence (Eng); Dissuasion nucléaire (Fr)
- Part of: Strategic Air Forces composed of: EC 1/4 Gascogne; EC 2/4 La Fayette; ETR 3/4 Aquitaine; ESTA 15/004 Haute-Marne
- Equipment: Dassault Rafale B/C (C for ETR 3/4 Aquitaine)

The 4^{e} Escadre de Chasse 4^{e} EC or 4th Fighter Wing (French: 4^{e} Escadre de Chasse) is a fighter unit (French: unité de chasse) formation of the French Air and Space Force. The unit was initially created on May 1, 1944 then dissolved on September 1, 1993 with the disappearing of the Escadre echelon from the French Air and Space Force.

The 4th Fighter Wing was reformed on an Aerial Base on August 26, 2015.

== History ==
The 4^{e} Escadre de Chasse was formed at Alto, Corsica on May 1, 1944, and initially was composed of a single group (Groupe de Chasse II/5 (GC II/5) La Fayette), equipped with 15 Republic P-47 Thunderbolts, being joined by Groupe de Chasse II/3 (GC II/3) Dauphiné on 8 June 1944. The wing was deployed on fighter-bomber missions over Italy from May to August 1944, and from June began to supplement these missions with operations over France. In September, following the Allied invasion of Southern France the previous month, the wing moved to mainland France. It was joined by a third group, Groupe de Chasse III/3 (GC III/3) Ardennes at the end of the year.

The 4^{e} Escadre de Chasse left the FATac on September 1, 1991 to be attached to the Strategic Air Forces Command (FAS).

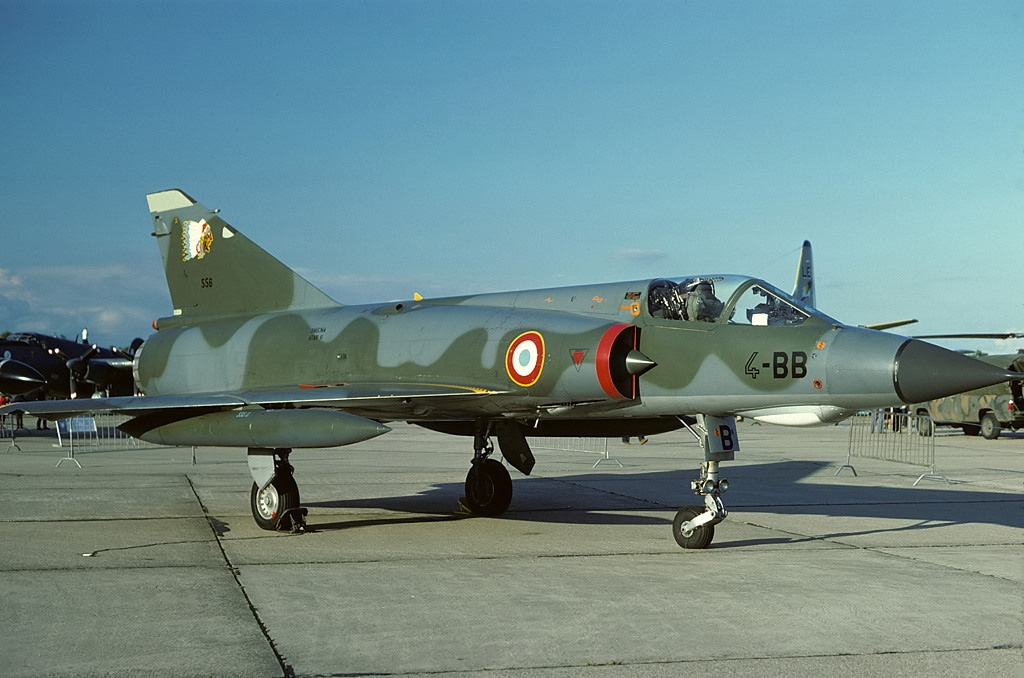
Mirage IIIE of the 2/4 La Fayette.

== Composition since 2015 ==
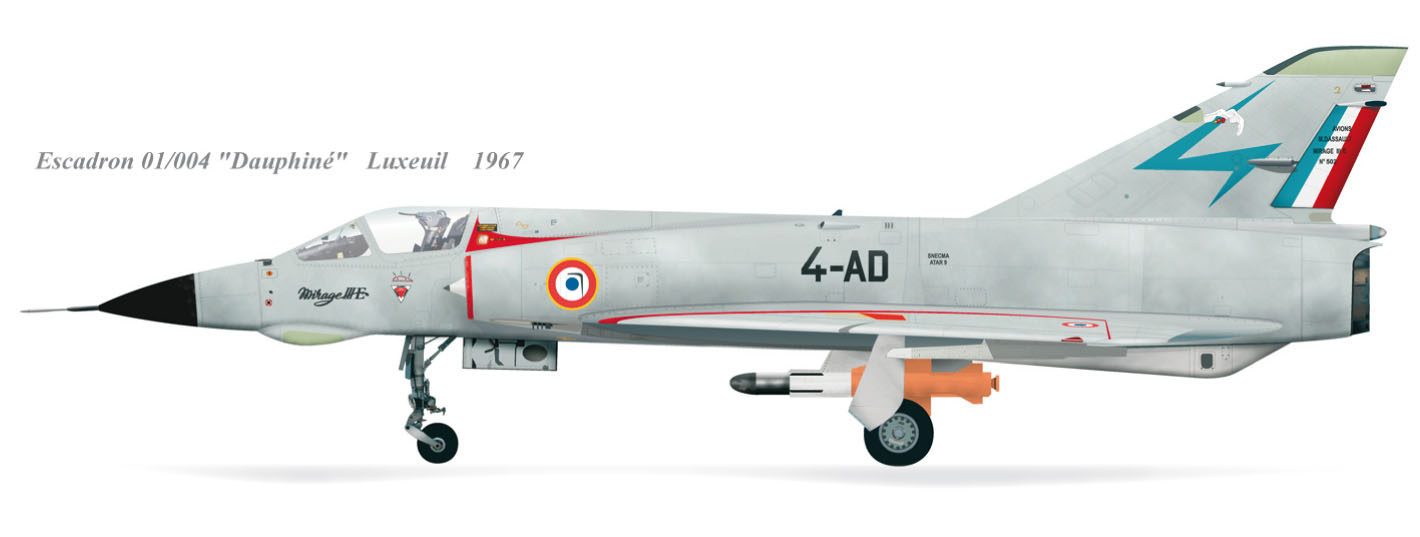
Mirage IIIE of the 1/4 Dauphiné.

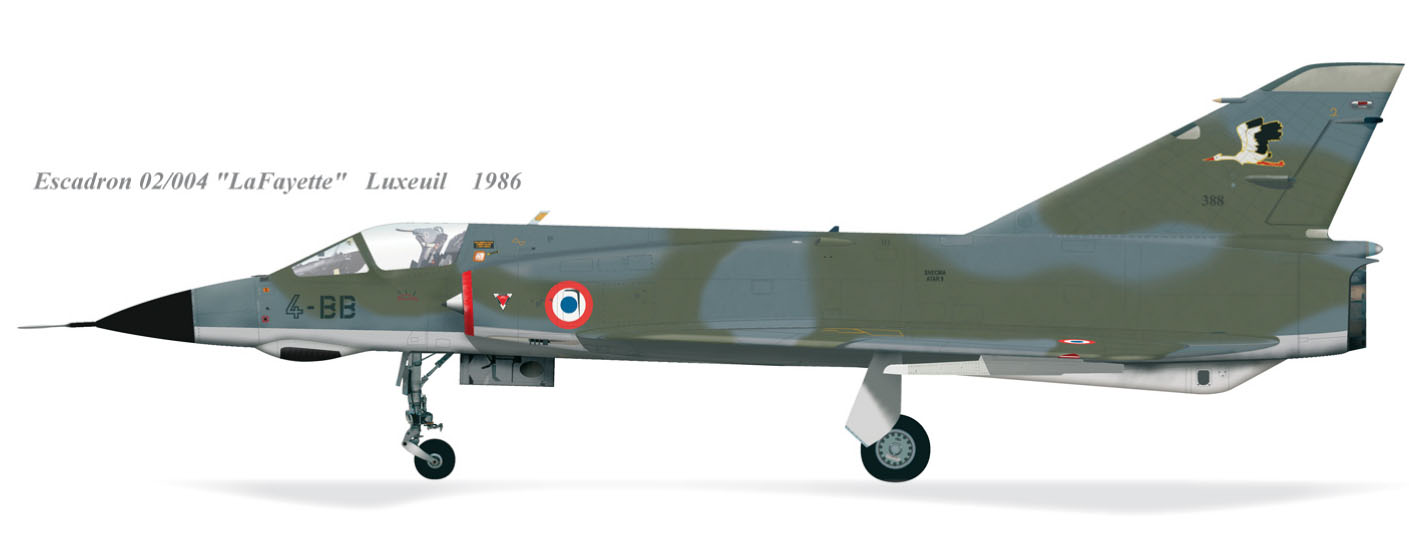
Mirage IIIE of the 2/4 La Fayette.

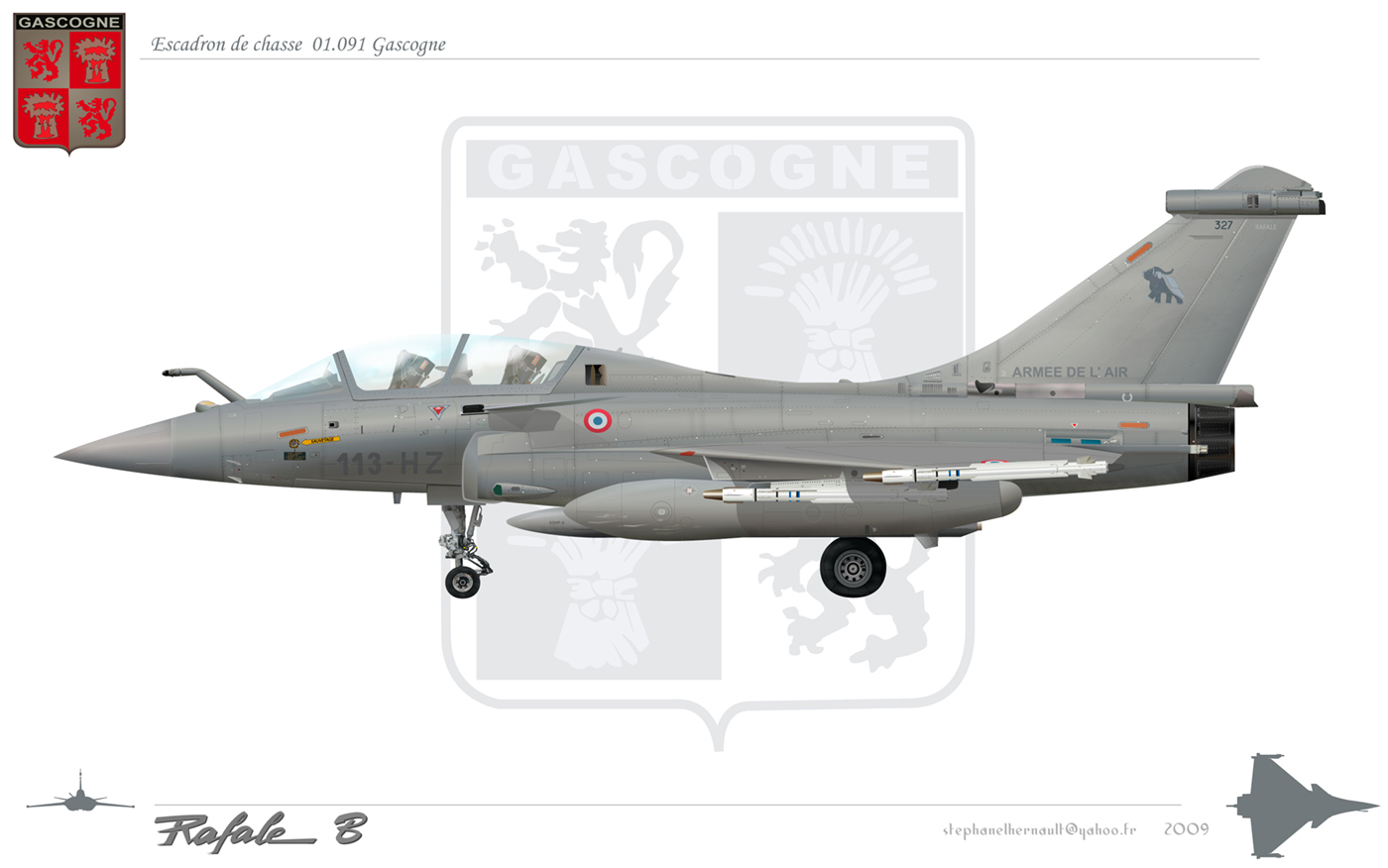
Rafale B du 1/91 Gascogne.

The 4^{e} Escadre de Chasse 4^{e} EC was reformed in 2015 with the following squadrons:

- Escadron de Chasse 1/4 Gascogne, EC 1/4 Gascogne
- Escadron de Chasse 2/4 La Fayette, EC 2/4 La Fayette
- Escadron de Transformation Rafale 3/4 Aquitaine, ETR 3/4 Aquitaine
- Escadron de Soutien Technique Aéronautique 15/004 Haute-Marne, ESTA 15/004 Haute-Marne

On June 24, 2016, a ceremony celebrated the departure of the 1/7 Provence towards an Aerial Base in the United Arab Emirates and the arrival of Escadron de Chasse 3/30 Lorraine to Saint Dizier. The EC 3/30 Lorraine moved to Mont-de-Marsan that summer. Nevertheless, the latter is not part of the 4^{e} Escadre de Chasse 4^{e} EC, however, constitutes the 30^{e} EC.

== Historical Escadrons/Squadrons ==
=== Ardennes ===
- Fighter Group (French: Groupe de Chasse) - Groupe de Chasse III/3 Ardennes (from October 31, 1944 until March 1, 1946)
- Fighter Squadron (French: Escadron de Chasse) - Escadron de Chasse 4/4 Ardennes (EC 4/4 Ardennes) (from January 1, 1950 until October 1, 1950), known as Escadron de Chasse 3/3 Ardennes at the corps of the 3^{e} Escadre de Chasse (3^{e} EC) at an Aerial Base.

=== Dauphiné ===
- Fighter Group - Groupe de Chasse II/3 Dauphiné (from May 1, 1944 until July 1, 1947)
- Fighter Group - Groupe de Chasse I/4 Dauphiné (from July 1, 1947 until November 1, 1949)
- Escadron de Chasse 1/4 Dauphiné (from November 1, 1949 until August 26, 1993)

=== Flandres ===
- Escadron de Chasse 3/4 Flandres (from January 1, 1950 until November 1, 1957)

=== La Fayette ===
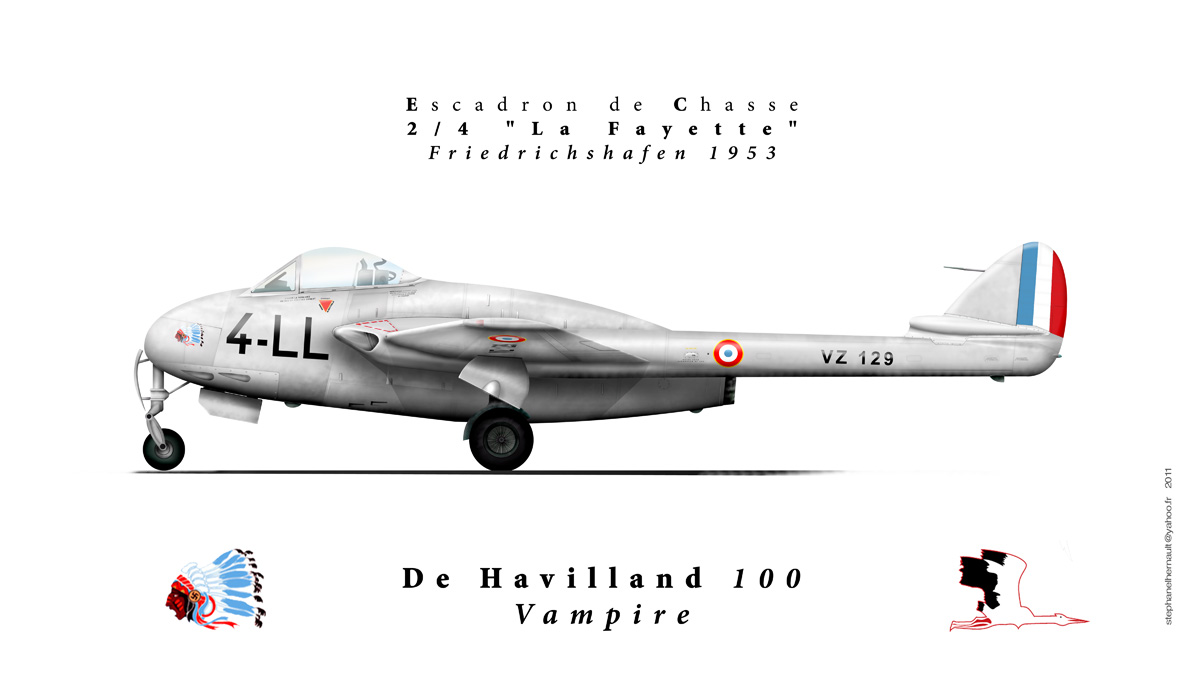
Vampire of the 2/4 La Fayette in 1953.

- Groupe de Chasse II/5 La Fayette (from May 1, 1944 until July 1, 1947)
- Groupe de Chasse II/4 La Fayette (from July 1, 1947 until November 1, 1949)
- Escadron de chasse 2/4 La Fayette (from November 1, 1949 until August 26, 1993)

=== Limousin ===
- Escadron de Chasse 3/4 Limousin (from August 1, 1989 until August 26, 1993)

=== Navarre ===
- Groupe de Chasse I/4 Navarre (from May 1, 1944 until December 7, 1994)

=== EALA ===
During the Algerian War, three Light Support Escadrilles Aviation units (French: Escadrilles d'Aviation Légère d'Appui, (EALA)) were patronized by the 4^{e} Escadre de Chasse :

- EALA 5/70 (from July 1, 1956 until June 30, 1957), re-designated EALA 17/72 (from July 1, 1957 until November 30, 1959)
- EALA 7/70 (from March 1, 1956 until June 30, 1957), re-designated EALA 18/72 (from July 1, 1957 November 30, 1959)
- EALA 3/4 (from December 1, 1959 until March 30, 1962)

== Base ==
- Alto, Corsica (1944)
- Ambérieu (1944-1945)
- Luxeuil (1944-1945)
- Coblence then Mayence (from August 29, 1945 until August 19, 1947)
- Indochina (Hanoi, Gia Lam and Don Hoi) (from August 19, 1947 until August 26, 1948)
- Base aérienne 136 Friedrichshafen in Germany (from August 26, 1948 until March 30, 1954)
- Aerial Base at Bône (from July 1, 1956 until November 30, 1959) (EALA 5/70, then EALA 17/72)
- Aerial Base at Oued Hamimin (from March 1, 1956 until November 30, 1959) (EALA 7/70 then EALA 8/72)
- Aerial Base at Telergma (from December 1, 1959 until March 30, 1962) (EALA 3/4)
- Base aérienne 136 Bremgarten (from April 1, 1954 until June 5, 1961)
- Base Aérienne 125 Istres-Le Tubé (from June 6, 1961 until August 26, 1993)
- Base Aérienne 116 Luxeuil Saint-Sauver (from August 1, 1989 until August 26, 1993) (for the 3/4 Limousin)
- Base Aérienne 113 Saint-Dizier-Robinson (August 26, 2015 – present)

== Equipment ==
- Republic P-47D Thunderbolt (from May 1, 1944 until December 1949)
- Supermarine Spitfire Mk.IX (from September 1947 until August 1948)
- De Havilland Vampire (from October 1949 until 1953)
- Dassault Ouragan (from July 1954 until 1957)
- Republic F-84F (from May 1957 until 1966)
- North American T-6G (from March 1, 1956 until February 1961) (
- North AmericanT-28 (from February 1961 until March 30, 1962)
- Dassault Mirage IIIE (from October 1966 until November 1, 1988)
- Dassault Mirage 2000N (from March 31, 1988 to June 30, 2018)
- Dassault Rafale B/C (since August 26, 2015)

== See also ==
- Major (France)
- Chief of Staff of the French Air Force
- List of Escadres of the French Air Force
- List of aircraft carriers of France
- Submarine forces (France)
