= Escadron de Chasse 2/4 La Fayette =

Fighter Squadron 2/4 La Fayette
- Escadron de Chasse 2/4 La Fayette
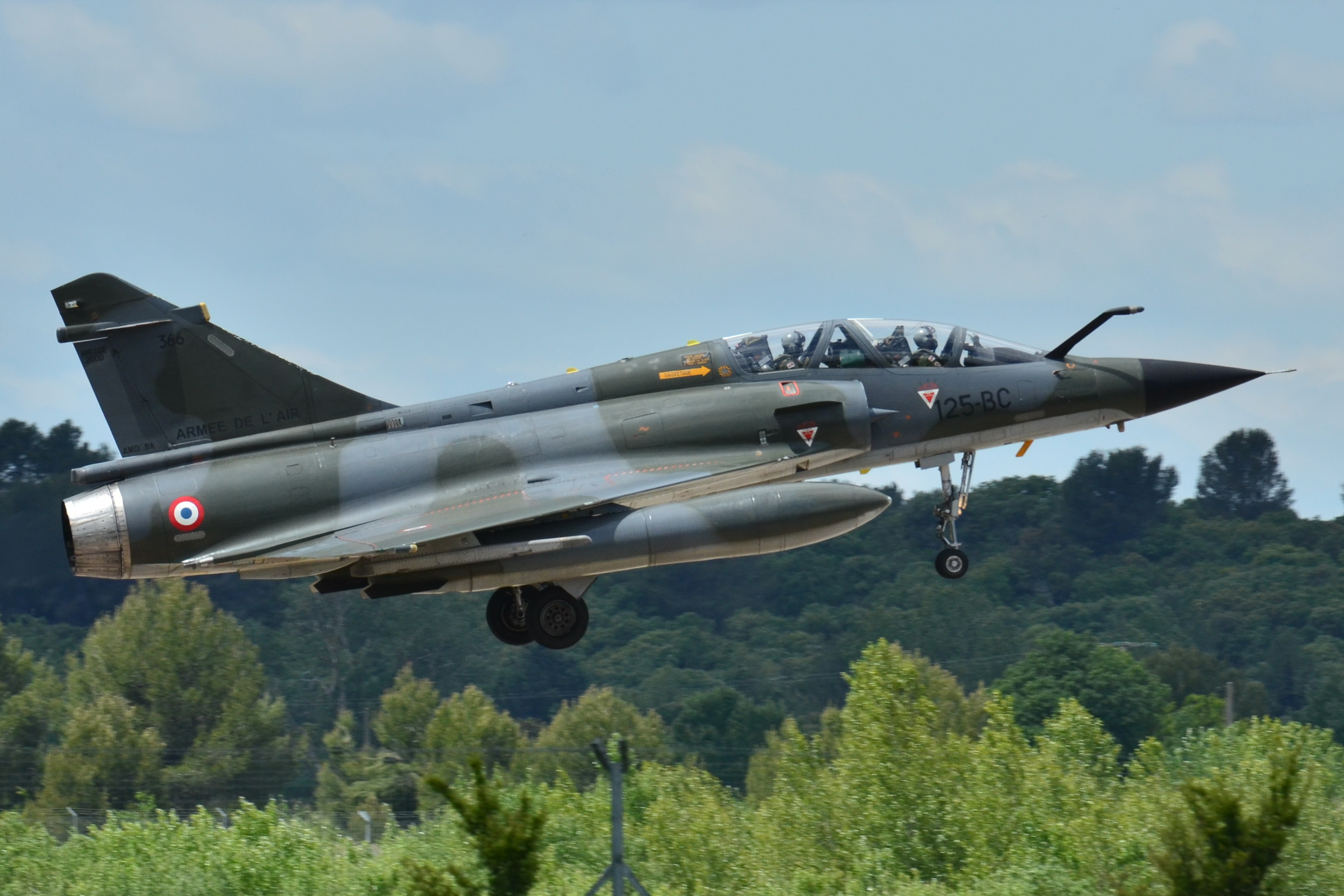
- Dassault Mirage 2000N
- Active: September 1933–present
- Country: France
- Branch: French Air and Space Force
- Type: Nuclear strike
- Role: Force de dissuasion (Nuclear deterrence)
- Part of: Strategic Air Forces Command; 4e Escadre de Chasse
- Garrison/HQ: BA 113 Saint-Dizier – Robinson Air Base
- Website: Official Website (in French)

Aircraft flown
- Fighter: Dassault Rafale

The Escadron de Chasse 2/4 Lafayette (Fighter Squadron 2/4 La Fayette) is a squadron of the French Air and Space Force (Armée de l'air et de l'espace). It is currently stationed at BA 113 Saint-Dizier – Robinson Air Base (ICAO: LFSI), and is equipped with the Dassault Rafale B. The squadron has a long history dating back to the First World War, and has seen service in the Second World War, the French Indochina War and Algeria. It is now a nuclear strike squadron.

== History ==
The squadron inherited the traditions of the Lafayette Escadrille of the First World War. The group was established in 1933 as the Groupe de Chasse II/5 La Fayette (GC II/5).

During the Battle of France, GC II/5 was equipped with American-built Curtiss H-75 fighters. The aircraft of the unit were painted with the same insignia depicting Chief Sitting Bull chosen by the American volunteers of the Lafayette Escadrille during the First World War before the entry of their country into the conflict.

Following the Armistice of 22 June 1940, the pilots and their aircraft were sent across the Mediterranean to French Algeria, under the control of Vichy France. On 9 November 1942, during Operation Torch, the Anglo-American landings in North Africa, these pilots flew against the landings. After the Army of Africa joined Free France, the group was reequipped with American Curtiss P-40 Warhawk fighters on 25 November. Retaining the Lafayette designation, GC II/5, under the command of Constantin Rozanoff, flew missions against Axis troops in Tunisia in 1942 and 1943.

In addition to Rozanoff, noted pilots Pierre Houzé, André-Armand Legrand, Jean Gisclon and Pierre Delachenal served with the unit.

=== Postwar ===
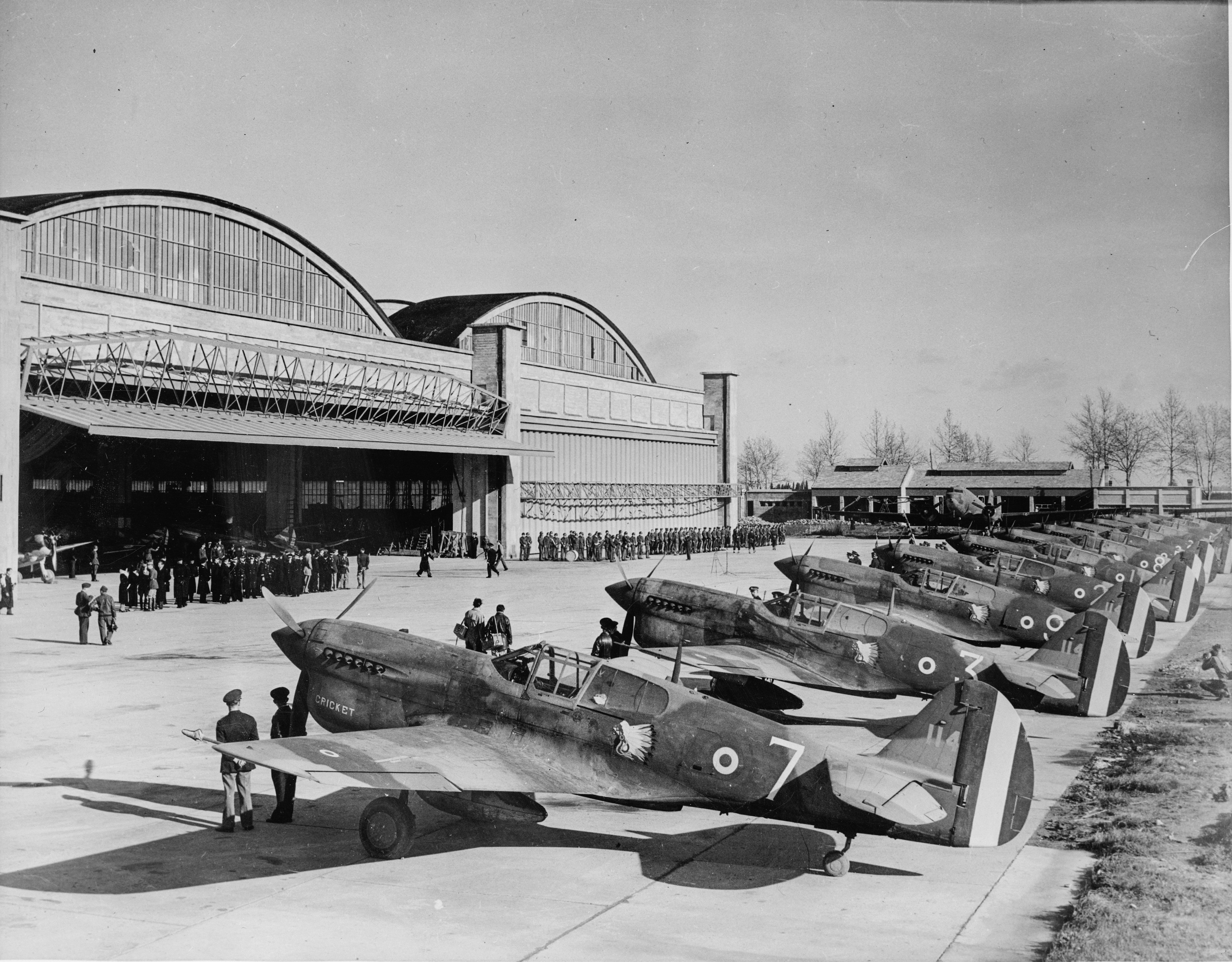
The ceremony marking the official transfer of 12 Curtiss P-40 Warhawks from United States control to Groupe de Chasse 2/5 "La Fayette" at Casablanca on January 9, 1943.

On 1 July 1947, the Escadrille was renumbered as GC II/4 La Fayette, still retaining the traditions of the Lafayette Escadrille. It was nicknamed the "Red Devils", due to the unit tail insignia, which depicted a winged devil. In 1949, GC II/4 was redesignated as Escadron de Chasse 2/4 (EC 2/4). It was based at Friedrichshafen and then Bremgarten in the French Zone of Germany.

The squadron participated in the First Indochina War and the Algerian War before moving to Luxeuil - Saint-Sauveur Air Base in 1961, where it was based until 2011.

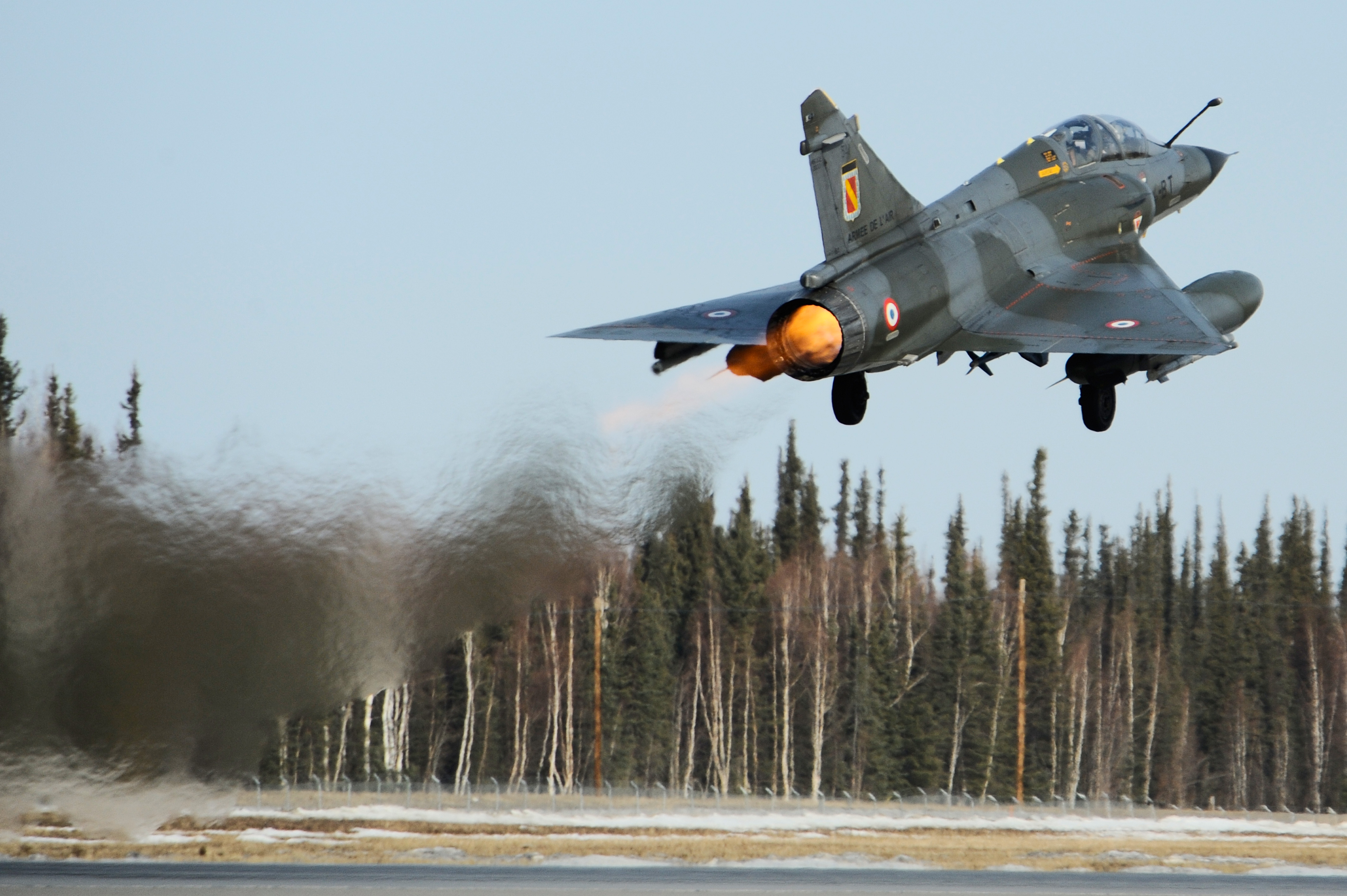
Mirage 2000N of the 2/4 Lafayette at Eielson Air Force Base during exercise Red Flag Alaska 09-2.

After being equipped successively with the Republic F-84F Thunderjet and Dassault Mirage IIIE fighters, EC 2/4 operated the Dassault Mirage 2000N from July 1989. The squadron became part of the Strategic Air Forces Command in 1991. In addition to its original mission of pre-strategic nuclear strike (French: frappe nucléaire pré-stratégique), a secondary mission of all-weather conventional attack was added in 1992. In 1996, the principal mission of the squadron became that strategic nuclear strike.

From 2006, EC 2/4 has also been tasked with training pilots and weapons systems operators on the Mirage 2000N. On 1 September 2011, it replaced Escadron d'Instruction en Vol 3/4 Limousin at Istres-Le Tubé Air Base. In 2015, three Mirage 2000Ns of the squadron participated in Opération Chammal, the French intervention against the terrorist group Islamic State of Iraq and the Levant. It received its first Rafale B at Saint-Dizier – Robinson Air Base in August of that year.

In 2016, a Mirage 2000N of the squadron received a special paint scheme to commemorate the centenary of the creation of the Lafayette Escadrille. The aircraft was used by the Ramex Delta display team, drawn from the squadron, in multiple airshows. It was retired from service that year and is displayed at Saint-Dizier – Robinson. In April of that year, a group of three Mirage 2000Ns from EC 2/4 participated in the air display marking the centenary of the Lafayette Escadrille alongside a Rafale B of Escadron de chasse 1/91 Gascogne, four Lockheed Martin F-22 Raptors of the United States Air Force 94th Fighter Squadron, a Stearman PT-17, and a Boeing B-52 Stratofortress of the United States Air Force 5th Bomb Wing.

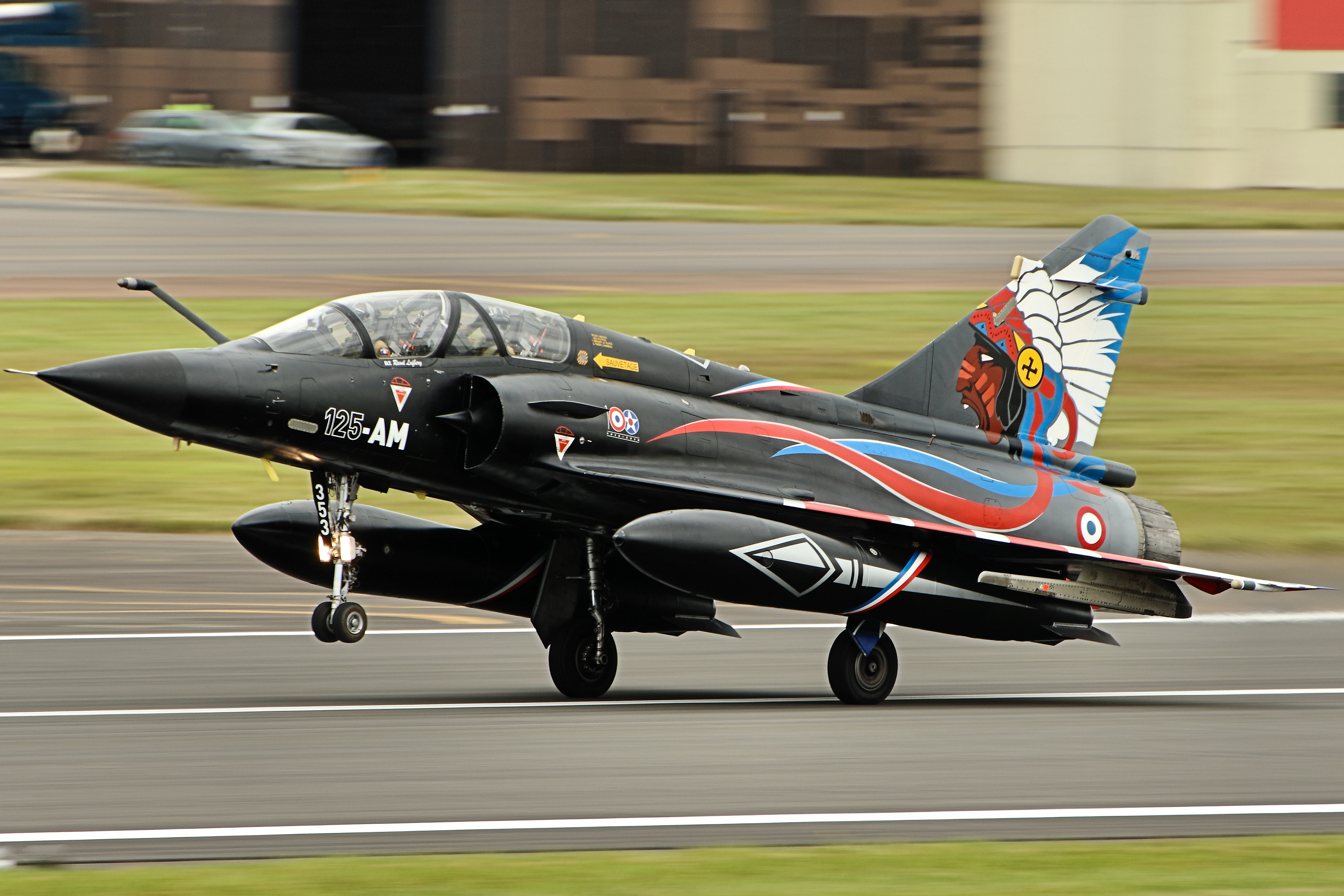
Decorated Mirage 2000N while landing at RIAT 2016.

== Decorations ==
The squadron has been mentioned in the orders of the French Air Force eight times, and is personnel are entitled to wear a Fourragere with the colors of the Croix de guerre 1914-1918, in addition to a Fourragere with the colors of the Médaille Militaire. For distinguishing itself in Opération Harmattan, the 2011 French intervention in Libya, EC 2/4 was awarded the Cross for Military Valour with bronze palm; it was also cited once in the orders of the French Air Force.

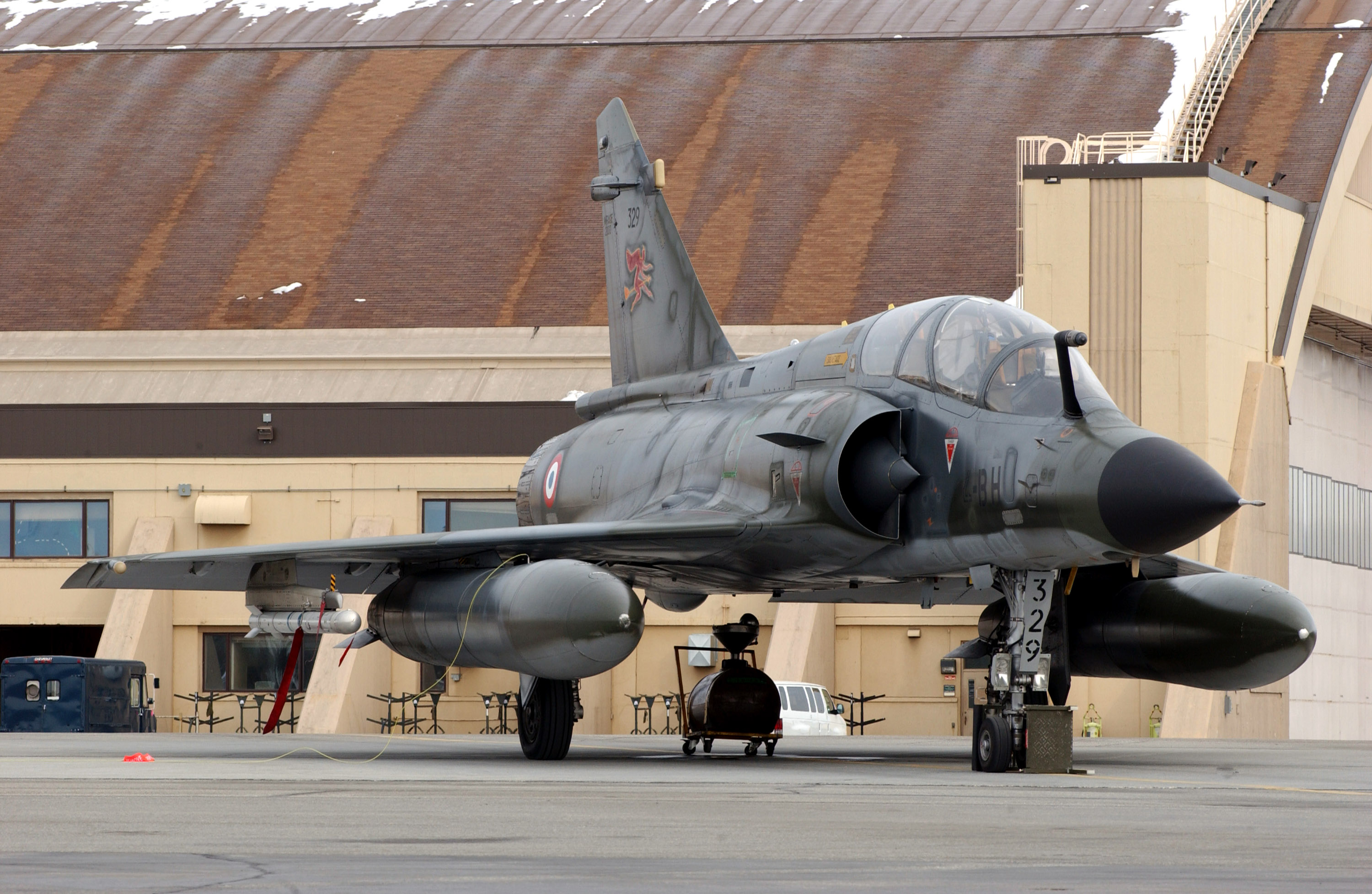
Mirage 2000N of the 2/4 bearing the insignia of the SPA160 during exercise Red Flag Alaska in 2007.

== Constituent Flights ==
In the French Air and Space Force escadron is the specific term used for a squadron. The squadrons are further divided into escadrilles (flights), which stem from the early aerial units of the French Army in the First World War. At this early stage in the development of military aviation aircraft designs were very rudimentary and the specialization into fighters, bombers, ground attack, reconnaissance types was still not existing, so the actual distinction that the French Army aerial fighting branch made was between aircraft types. This was followed by subsequent numbers, going from 1 well into the triple digits. At the end of the unit name stood the nickname, chosen by its pilots. The traditions of these early military aerial units are carried on to the present day.

The escadrilles of Fighter Squadron 2/4 "La Fayette" carry on the traditions of World War I units equipped with Nieuport (N) and Société pour l'aviation et ses dérivés - SPAD (SPA) aircraft:

- N124 Sioux
- SPA 167 Cigognes de Romanet
- SPA 81 Lévrier
- SPA 96 Gaulois

== Designations ==
- Groupe de Chasse II/5, September 1933–1 December 1942
- Groupe de Chasse II/5 La Fayette, 1 December 1942–1 July 1947
- Groupe de Chasse II/4 La Fayette, 1 July 1947–1 November 1949
- Escadron de Chasse 2/4 La Fayette, 1 November 1949–present

== Aircraft operated ==
- de Havilland Vampire (1949–1953)
- Republic F-84 Thunderjet (1957–1966)
- Dassault Mirage IIIE (1966–1988)
- Dassault Mirage 2000N (1988–2018)
- Dassault Rafale (2018–present)
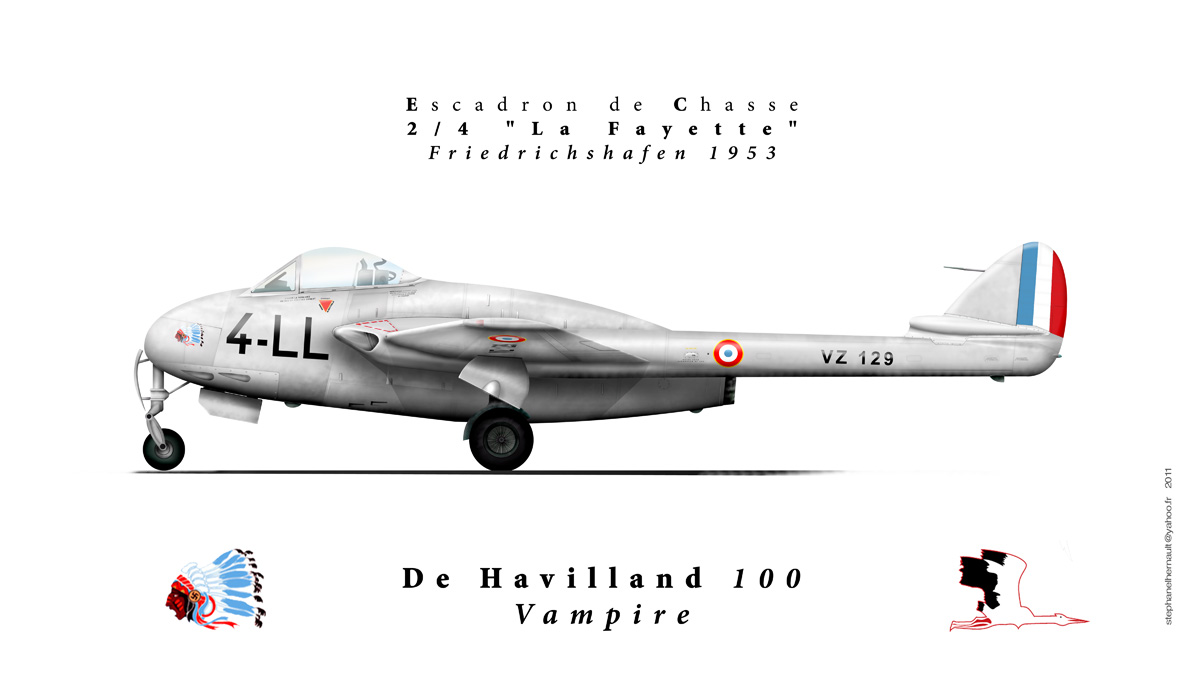
Vampire of the 2/4 in 1953.

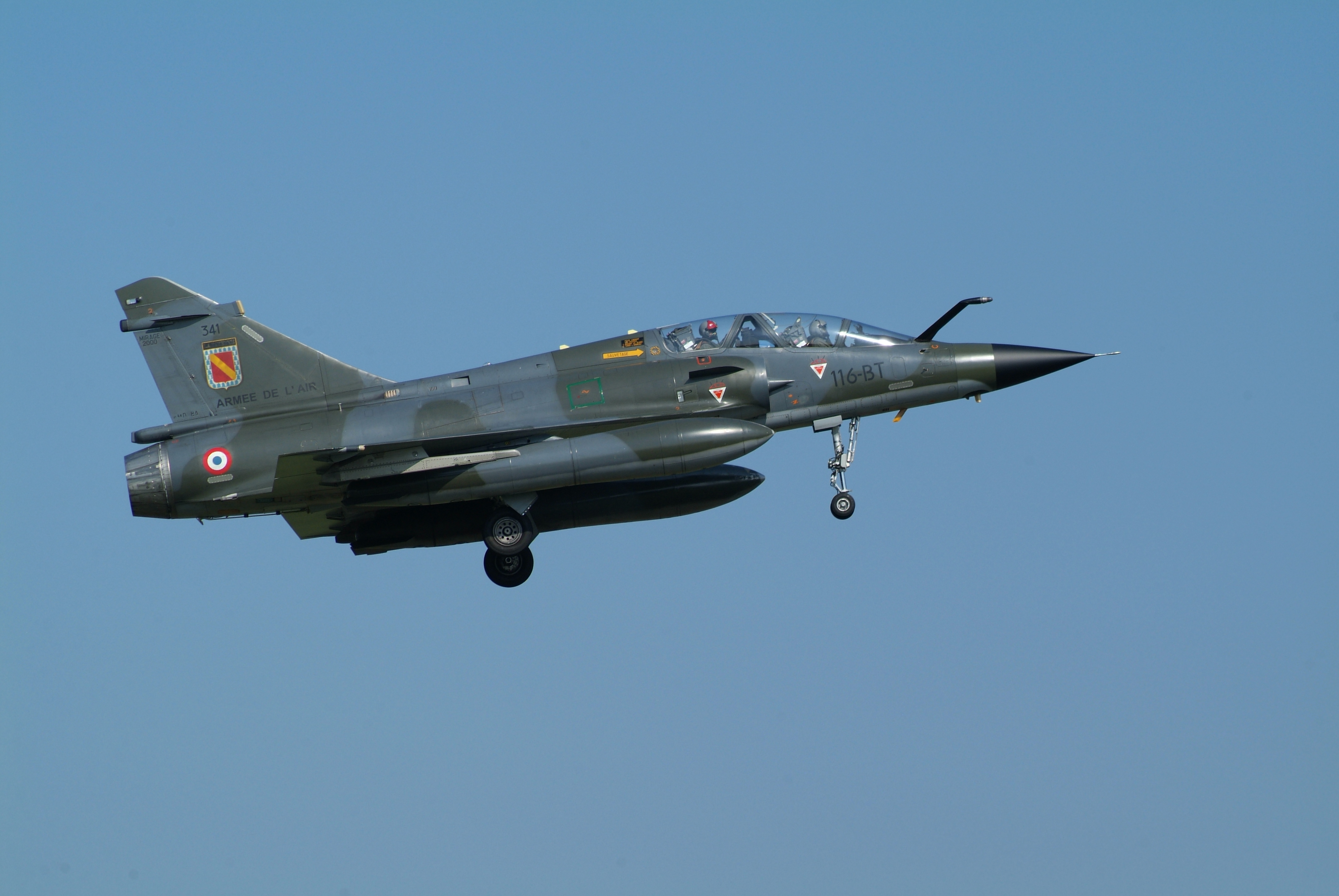
Mirage 2000N of the 2/4.

== See also ==
- Chief of Staff of the French Air and Space Force
- List of Escadres of the French Air and Space Force
- List of French Air and Space Force aircraft squadrons
- List of aircraft carriers of France
- Escadron de Chasse 1/4 Gascogne
- Submarine forces (France)
