= Escadron de Transformation Rafale 3/4 Aquitaine =

Rafale Transition Squadron 3/4 Aquitaine
- Escadron de Transformation Rafale 3/4 Aquitaine
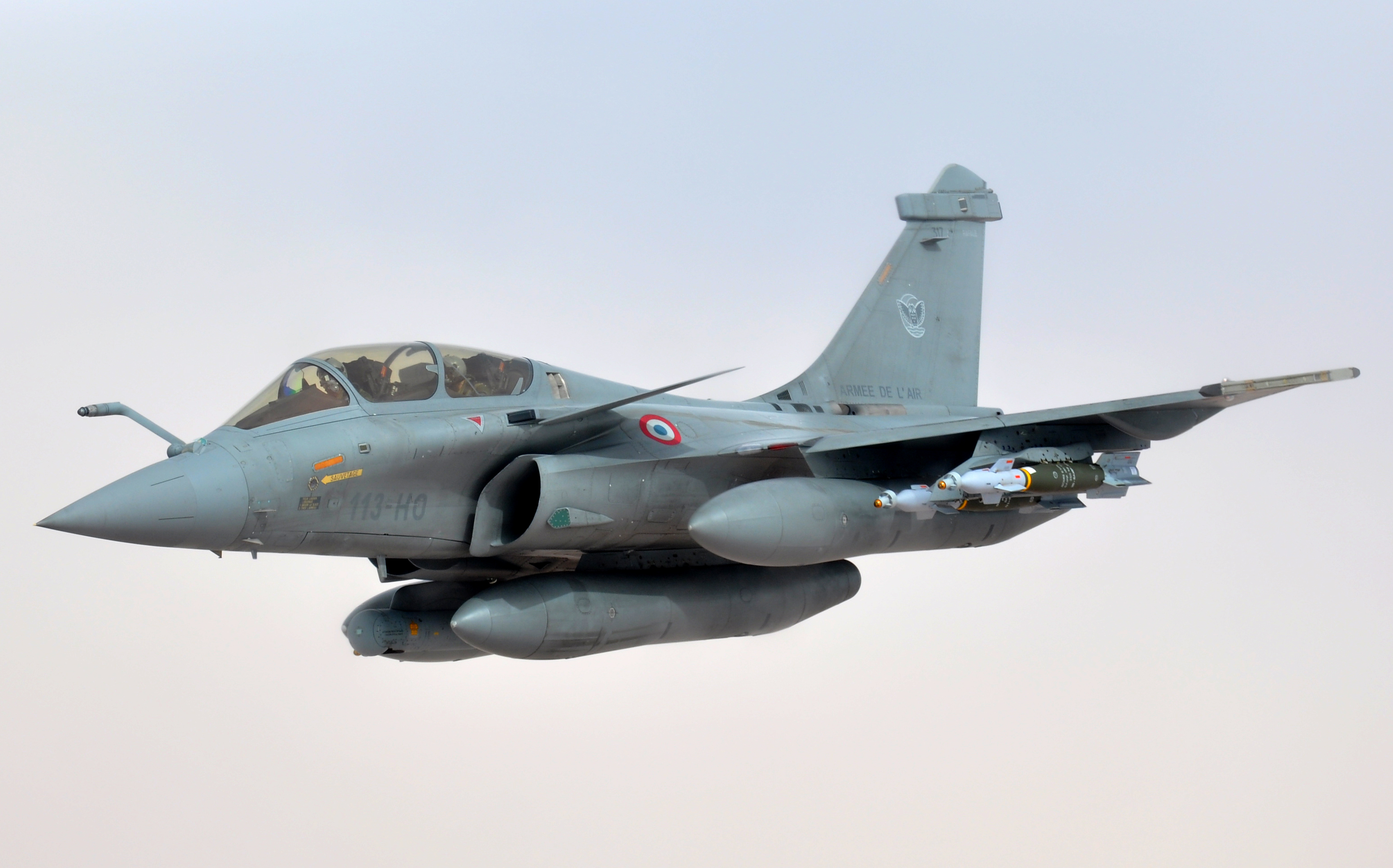
- Rafale B317 113-HO of the ETR 2/92.
- Active: November 1, 1958 - present
- Country: France
- Branch: Armée de l'air et de l'espace
- Type: Fighter aircraft
- Part of: 4^{e} Escadre de Chasse
- Garrison/HQ: BA 113 Saint-Dizier – Robinson Air Base

Aircraft flown
- Trainer: Dassault Rafale

The Escadron de Transformation Rafale 3/4 Aquitaine (Rafale Transition Squadron 3/4 Aquitaine) is an Operational conversion unit of the French Air and Space Force (Armée de l'air et de l'espace) flying the Dassault Rafale, based at BA 113 Saint-Dizier – Robinson Air Base.

The unit has taken up the traditions of Escadron de Bombardement 2/92 Aquitaine (EB 2/92 Aquitaine) which operated SNCASO SO-4050 Vautour then CIFAS 328 Aquitaine on Dassault Mirage IVA.

The squadron was reformed under the designation of Escadron de Transformation Rafale 2/92 Aquitaine on October 6, 2010, at St-Dizier-Robinson, presided over by the then Minister of Défense. The 2/92 Aquitaine was attached as of August 26, 2015 to the 4^{e} Escadre de Chasse which was reformed the same day on the same base.

The unit took the current designation of Escadron de Transformation Rafale 3/4 Aquitaine on September 1, 2016. The squadron operates the Rafales of the French Air and Space Force, and equally operates the Rafale M as part of French Naval Aviation. In 2017, three Rafale M were assigned to the squadron.

== History ==
=== Cognac ===
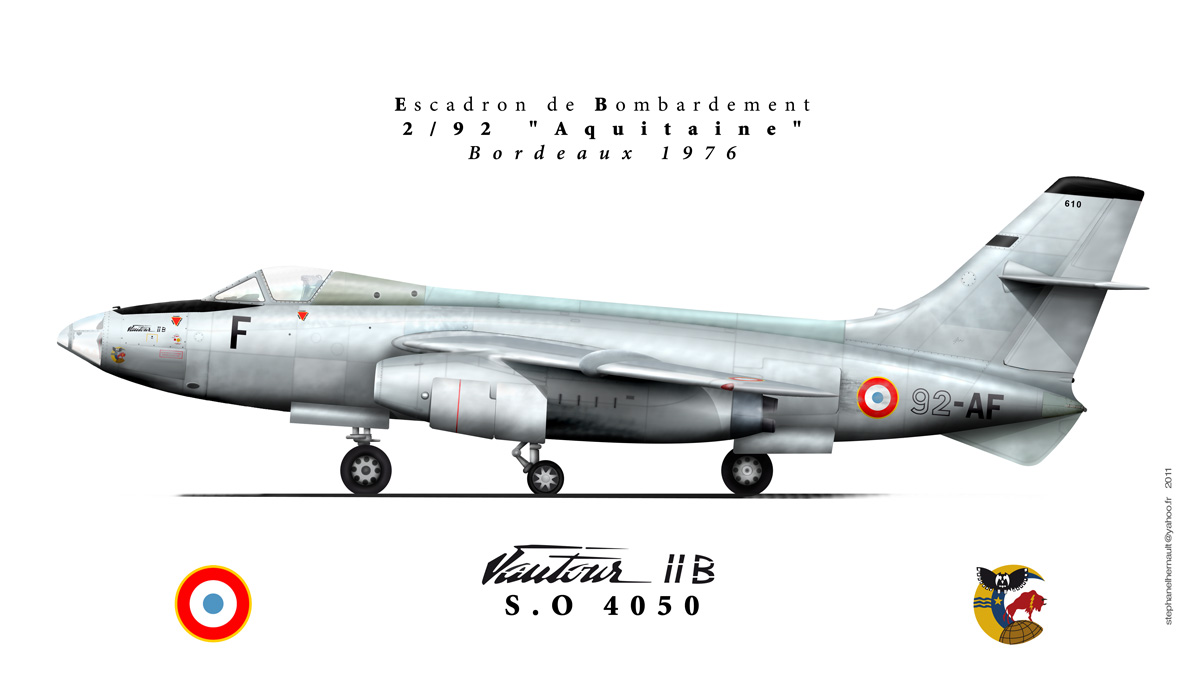
Vautour IIB du 2/92 Aquitaine.

The center of Bombardment instruction - Centre d'Instruction du Bombardment 328 (CIB 328) was established at Cognac. Constituted of a squadron on B-26 Invader and another on CM-170 Magister, SNCASO SO-4050 VautourIIA and Vautour IIB, the mission of the latter was the selection and instruction of future unit crews of the B-26 and the Squadrons of bombardment Vautour.

The 92nd Bombardment Brigade was formed on December 12, 1958, at Cognac. The Escadron de Bombardement 2/92 was created towards the end of 1959. On May 26 195, the squadron retook traditions of the GB I/25 Tunisia and adopted the designation of Escadron de Bombardement 2/92 Aquitaine (the "Tunisia" designation was abandoned after the country became independent).

In addition to the 2/92 of the 92nd Brigade was composed of the CIB 328 and the Escadron de Bombardement 1/92 Bourgogne. The three squadrons operated the twin-seat version of the Vautour IIB, with bombardment at high altitude as its principal mission.

=== On Vautour to Bordeaux ===
Between March and April 1961, the 92nd Brigade was based at Bordeaux-Merignac Air Base.

Four Vautours of the 2/92 were detached one month to Thailand for Southeast Asia Treaty Organisation (SEATO) exercises.

The 92nd Brigade became the 92e Escadre de Bombardement (92e EB) on May 1, 1964, with the 1/92 Bourgogne and 2/92 Aquitaine attached respectively to the unit.

== Successive designations ==
- Escadron de Bombardement (EB) 2/92 Aquitaine: from November 1, 1958, until September 1, 1974 (EB 2/92 Aquitaine)
- Centre d'instruction des Forces aériennes stratégiques (CIFAS) 328 Aquitaine : from September 1, 1978 to September 1, 1991
- Escadron de Reconnaissance et d'Instruction (ERI) 328 : from September 1, 1991 to June 30, 1992 (*)
- Centre d'Instruction Tactique (CITAC) 339 Aquitaine : from March 5, 2001 to June 30, 2006
- Centre de Formation des Équipages de Mirage 2000N (CFEN) : from June 30, 2006 to June 1, 2010 (*)
- Escadron de Transformation Rafale (ETR) 2/92 Aquitaine : from June 1, 2010 to September 1, 2016
- Escadron de Transformation Rafale 3/4 Aquitaine : since of September 1, 2016

(*) only for the escadrilles (4B3 and I/25(2))

== Successive attachments ==
- 92^{e} Escadre de Bombardement : from 01/11/1958 to 01/09/1974
- 4^{e} Escadre de Chasse : as of 26/08/2015

== Escadrilles ==
- 1st Escadrille : Escadrille 4B3 : since November 1, 1958
- 2nd Escadrille : Escadrille I/25 (2) : since November 1, 1958
- 3rd Escadrille : SPA 160 "Diable rouge" : since April 1, 2016

== See also ==
- List of French Air and Space Force aircraft squadrons
