= Groupe de ravitaillement en vol 2/91 Bretagne =

Groupe de ravitaillement en vol 2/91 Bretagne Air Supply Group 2/91 Bretagne
- Active: January 1, 1942 - October 4, 2019
- Country: France
- Branch: French Air and Space Force
- Role: Air Supply
- Part of: 31^{e} Escadre Aérienne de Ravitaillement et de Transport Stratégiques composed of 4 Escadrilles
- Equipment: Boeing KC-135FR Stratotanker / Boeing C-135FR Stratolifter
- Engagements: World War II; Bosnian War; Kosovo War; War in Afghanistan; Libyan Civil War; Northern Mali conflict

The Groupe de ravitaillement en vol 2/91 Bretagne (French: Groupe de ravitaillement en vol 2/91 Bretagne) or Air Supply Group 2/91 Bretagne was a unit of the French Air and Space Force specialized in missions of air supply. Implanted on an Aerial Base, the unit was equipped with Boeing KC-135FR Stratotanker and Boeing C-135FR Stratolifter tanker/transports.

Titled with 6 citations at the orders of the armed forces during the Second World War, the Bombardment Group Bretagne (French: groupe de bombardement « Bretagne »), which the group associates traditions which has been awarded the Fourragere of the war 1939–1945 at colors of the Order of the Légion d'honneur.

== History ==
The Bombardment Group Bretagne (French: groupe de bombardement « Bretagne ») was created on January 1, 1942, at Fort-Lamy, in Tchad, from the permanent detachment of Aerial Forces of Tchad (French: Détachement Permanent des Forces Aériennes au Tchad, (DPFAT)). Becoming the bombardment group - Groupe de Bombardement Moyen II/20 Bretagne, the latter took part to various World War II campaigns including the Fezzan campaign, Tunisia, Italy, the Liberation of Alsace and bombardments of Germany.

In 1946, the unit became a Transport Group (French: Groupe de Transport), the group was numbered I/63 Bretagne in July 1947. The unit operated in Africa, until dissolution in 1963.

The bombardment squadron - Escadron de Bombardment 2/91, created previously on December 1, 1964, at the corps of the 91^{e} Escadre de Bombardement (French: 91^{e} Escadre de Bombardement), retook the traditions of Bretagne. On April 1, 1965, the first Mirage IVA arrived to the squadron. After a drop on the firing field of Colomb-Béchar, the squadron was operational in July and integrated the ensemble plan of the nuclear force de dissuasion until dissolution, on July 31, 1996.

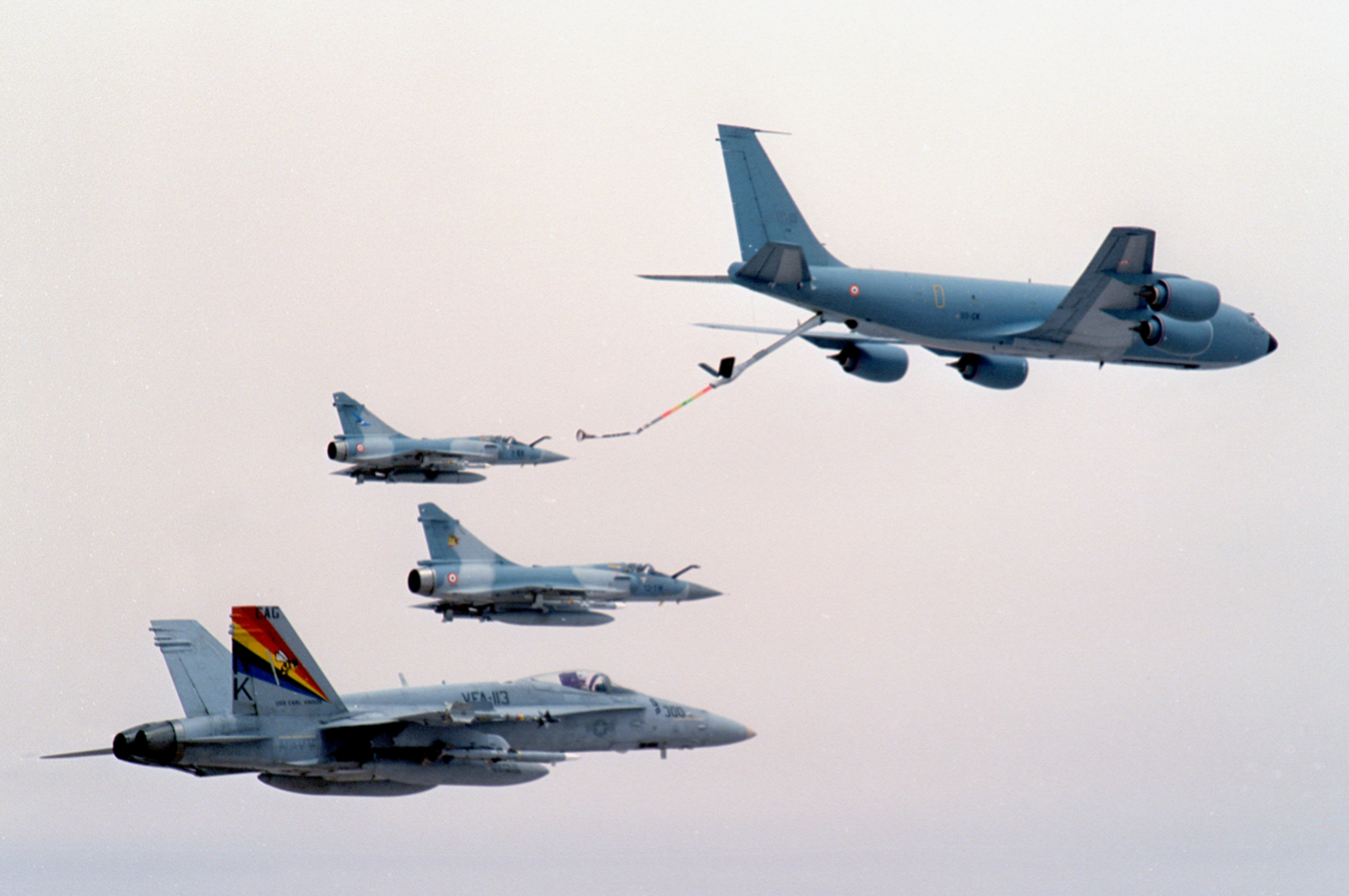
a C-135 refueling 2 French Mirage 2000 and 1 U.S. VFA-113 F/A-18 during Operation Southern Watch (April 23, 1994).

The first unit of the French Air Force to be equipped with means of air supply was the 90^{e} Escadre in August 1963. Initially equipped with 12 C-135FR, the 90^{e} Escadre de Ravitaillement en Vol (ERV) and the other air supply units were spread at the corps of 3 Mixed Escadres Bombardment Mirage IV/C-135FR in 1965. In 1976, the Air Supply Escadrons/Squadrons (French: Escadrons de Ravitaillement en Vol) were united at the corps of the 93e Escadre de Ravitaillement en Vol (French: 93e escadre de ravitaillement en vol, 93^{e} Escadre de Ravitaillement en Vol) until 1993.

On August 1, 1996, the Escadrons de Ravitaillement en Vol (ERV) 1/93 Aunis and 3/93 Landes were dissolved. The air supply means (French: moyens de ravitaillement en vol) of these two squadrons were regrouped at the corps of a new ERV 93 Bretagne created the day. The unit became the only composition of the French Air Force to put into effect air supply means with C-135FR. The 2 Escadrilles of Landes (SPA Bi 54 and SAL 22) were preserved at the corps of ERV 93, as well as the traditional escadrille Rennes and Nantes.

On September 1, 2004, the ERV lost the designation of Escadron/Squadron to become a Group and was designated Groupe de Ravitaillement en Vol 00.093 « Bretagne ».

Since August 2009, the «Bretagne» has retaken the designation of Groupe de Ravitaillement en Vol 2/91

In 2012, the escadrilles Rennes, Nantes and SPA Bi were dissolved and replaced with three other units.

On August 27, 2014, the 31^{e} Escadre Aérienne de Ravitaillement et de Transport Stratégiques was created on an Aerial Base. The latter regrouped GRV 2/91 Bretagne and the Specialized Technical Support Squadron (French: Escadron des Soutiens Techniques Spécialisés) (ESTS) 15/93.

On October 4, 2019, the GRV 2/91 is renamed Sologne (disbanded on June 30, 2025) and Bretagne became Escadron de Ravitaillement en Vol et de Transport Stratégiques ERVTS 01.031.

== Missions ==
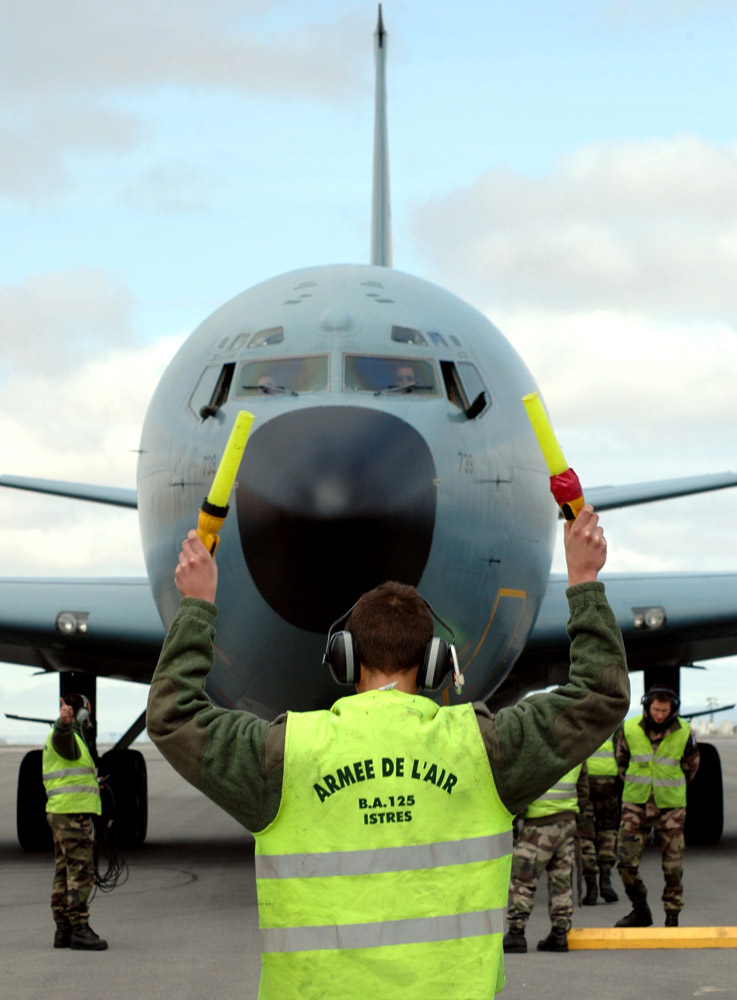
A C-135FR of ERV 4/94 « Sologne » at Manas Air Base in Kyrgyzstan (29 May 2007).

The principal mission of this aerial unit is inscribed by the air support supply and transmissions of the Mirage 2000N and Rafale (F3) of the Strategic Air Forces.

Since 1980, the C-135 have participated to the following operations:

- Tchad : Operation Manta (French: Manta) (1983), Operation Épervier (French: Épervier),
- Gabon : Murène (1981/1982),
- Lebanon : Chevesne (1984),
- Saudi Arabia : Daguet (1990/1991), Alysse (1991),
- Turkey : ACONIT (1992/96),
- Bosnia and Herzegovina : Crécerelle, Salamandre (1993),
- Kosovo : Operation Trident (French: Trident) (1999),
- Afghanistan : Enduring Freedom - Héraclès (2001/2002),
- Côte d'Ivoire : Opération Licorne (French: Licorne) (2002),
- Democratic Republic of the Congo : summer 2003.
- Libya : Harmattan (2011)
- Mali : Operation Serval (2013)

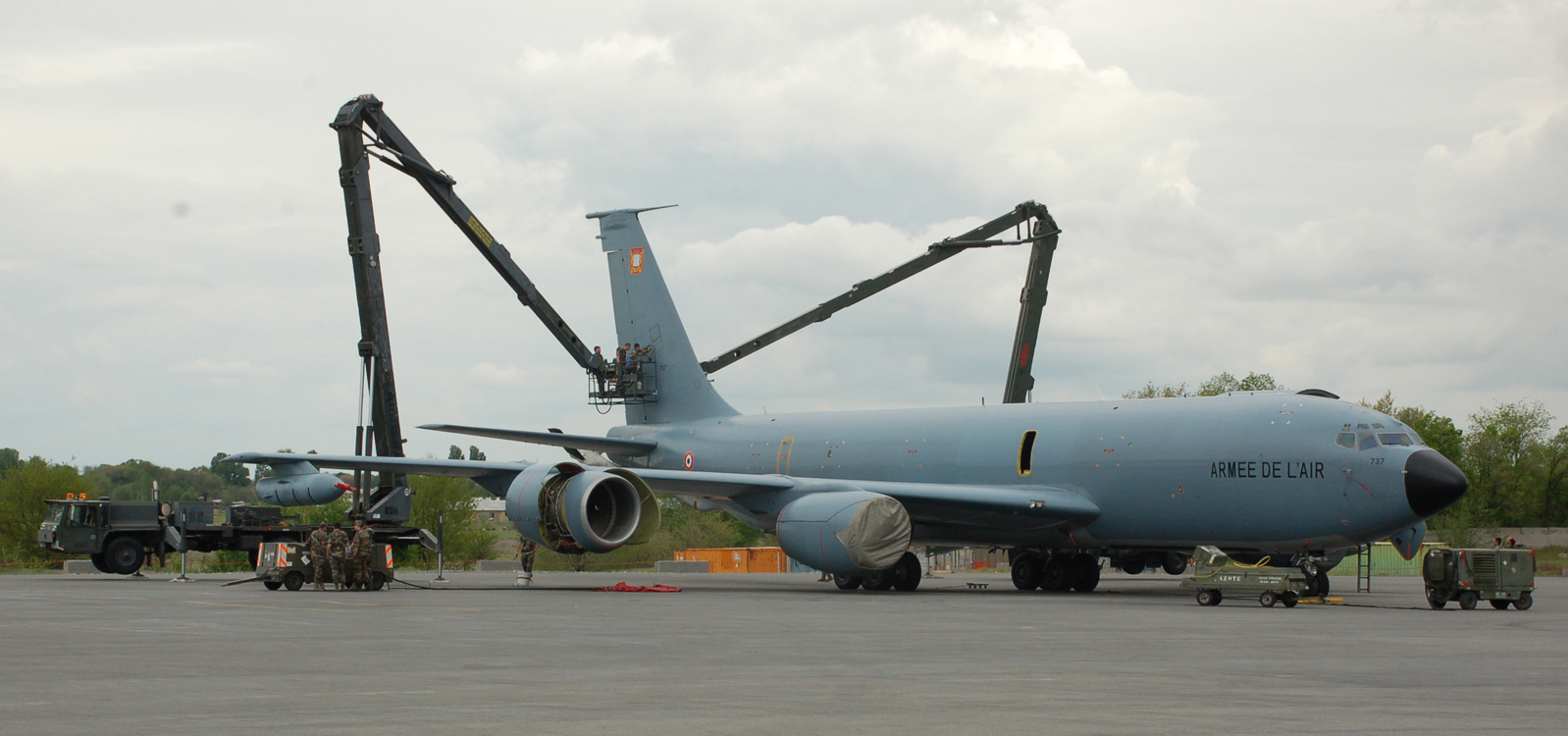
A C-135 undergoing maintenance on an Aerial Base in 2009.

== Equipment ==
- 11 C-135FRs, 12 purchased new from Boeing, first delivered in 1964. 1 was lost in 1972.
- 3 KC-135RGs purchased used from US Air Force stocks in 1997.

In 2014, it was announced that a demand for 12 Airbus A330 MRTT Phénix, one to two exemplary to be delivered by 2018 to replace 14 C-135 as well as other aircraft in the French Air Force.

== Successive denominations ==
- Groupe de Bombardement Bretagne : (1942 to 1943)
- Groupe de Bombardement Moyen II/20 Bretagne : (1943 to 1944)
- Groupe de Bombardement II/20 Bretagne : (1944 to 1946)
- Groupe de Transport II/20 Bretagne : (1946 until July 1, 1947)
- Groupe de Transport I/63 Bretagne : (July 1, 1947 until 1963)
- Escadron de Bombardement 2/91 Bretagne : (December 1, 1964 until July 31, 1996)
- Escadron de Ravitaillement en Vol 94 Bretagne : (August 1, 1996 until September 1, 2004)
- Groupe de Ravitaillement en Vol 94 Bretagne : (September 1, 2004 until August 1, 2009)
- Groupe de Ravitaillement en Vol 2/91 Bretagne : (since August 1, 2009)

== See also ==
- List of Escadres of the French Air Force

== Bibliography ==
- Lefebvre, Jean-Michel (May 1976). "Avec les ravitalilleurs Française: Chez les pompistes volants, la maison n'astique pas les pare-brise" [With the French Aerial Refuellers: The Flying Gas Jockeys Do Not Wash the Windshields]. Le Fana de l'Aviation (in French) (78): 20–23. ISSN 0757-4169.
- Lefebvre, Jean-Michel (June 1976). "Avec les ravitalilleurs Française: Chez les pompistes volants, la maison n'astique pas les pare-brise (2)" [With the French Aerial Refuellers: The Flying Gas Jockeys Do Not Wash the Windshields (2)]. Le Fana de l'Aviation (in French) (79): 24–28. ISSN 0757-4169.
