= Taverny Air Base =

Headquarters of the French Strategic Air Forces Command

Coordinates: 49°02′00″N 2°13′00″E

- Base Aérienne 921 "Frères Mahé" de Taverny
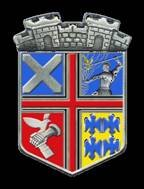
- Country: France
- Branch: French Air and Space Force
- Role: Command center
- Size: 300

Commanders
- Current commander: Olivier Salabert

Taverny Air Base (formerly Base Aérienne 921 "Frères Mahé" de Taverny; ICAO: LFPJ) is located in the communities of Taverny and Bessancourt in the Val-d'Oise department of France, 20 km (12.4 mi) north-northwest of Paris. From 1964 to 2007 and again since 2024 it has been the headquarters of the Strategic Air Forces Command, the nuclear strike force of the French Air and Space Force, with an underground command center.

The base is divided into three tiers with an area of approximately 15 hectares:

- The first tier is underground in a former gypsum quarry beneath the Forest of Montmorency. The facility comprised the hardened command facility for the French Air Force.
- The second tier is on the surface, and provided support services for the underground command center.
- The third tier is at the top of the hill, with facilities for secure military communications.

There were no aviation facilities apart from a heliport.

== Description ==
The base is located on the flank of the heights of the community of Taverny, with the hardened facility between 70 and 80 meters below the surface in the former quarries. The tunnels are large enough for trucks to enter. The underground climate is described as warm and dry, but the tunnels require monitoring for water penetration and dissolution of the gypsum. Somewhat more than 1000 personnel are employed at the base.

The facility is provided with backup power and an independent water supply. A 2000m² Faraday Cage was completed in 1993 after six years of construction - one of the largest in Europe.

== History ==
- 1815: First commercial exploitation as a gypsum quarry.
- 1941–1944: During World War II, the German occupiers converted some of these tunnels for industrial use. The SKF ball bearing factory was moved there from south of Paris. At the time of the Allied invasion, the manufacture of ball bearings had been started. The two main tunnels were connected and an entrance structure with gates was constructed. Before their evacuation of Paris, the Germans destroyed the equipment in the tunnels. Several places in the area of the plant show evidence of fire. According to a villager, the Germans used oil fires to destroy the equipment. This caused cracking and falling rocks. Mines and booby traps were left behind in the tunnels and the nearby woods; these were removed, along with the remains of the plant, by the U.S. Army. There is no evidence that the Allies bombed the tunnels during the occupation.
- 1946: The French Air Force used the quarry as a depot.
- 1957: The creation of the Air Defense Operations Center (Centre d'Opération de la Défense Aérienne - CODA).
- 1961: The creation of the Territorial Air Defense Staff (Etat-major de la Defense Aérienne du Territoire - DAT) and the Air Force Air Defense Command (Commandement Air des Forces de Défense Aérienne - CAFDA). These organizations were dissolved in 1994 and replaced with the Air Defense and Air Operations Command (Commandement de la Défense Aérienne et des Opérations Aériennes - CDAOA) and its Air Operations Center (Centre de Conduite des Opérations Aériennes - CCOA).
- 1963: Creation of BA921, attached to the 2nd Air Region, and the installation on the surface of the Strategic Air Forces Command (Commandement des Forces Aériennes Stratégiques - CFAS).
- 1967: Installation of the Strategic Forces Operations Center (Centre d'Opérations des forces stratégiques - COFAS) underground.
- 1988: BA921 takes the name "Frères Mahé" ("Brothers Mahé" in English) in homage to three brothers killed in the command of their aircraft.
- 1992: Installation of the Special Operations Command (Commandement des Opérations Spéciales - COS).
- 2000: BA921 was attached to the Northern Air Region.
- 2006: Special Operations Command (COS) moves to BA107 at Villacoublay.
- 2007: The Air Operations Center moves to BA942 at Lyon Mont-Verdun. At the same time, the Air Defense and Air Operations (CDAOA) moves to BA117 in Paris and the Air Information Center (Centre de Renseignement Air - CRA) moves to BA128 at Metz.
- 2011: BA 921 is disestablished on 5 July 2011.
- 2020 : In the spring of 2020, it is decided to relocate the headquarters of the Strategic Air Forces on the base, i.e. a hundred people plus the ancillary services in 2024

== Nuclear deterrent ==
Taverny provided information to the following organizations:

- The commander of the strategic air forces (Commandement des forces aériennes stratégiques - CFAS), which constitute one leg of France's nuclear deterrent.
- The Analysis and Simulation Center for the Preparation of Air Operations (Centre d'Analyse et de Simulation pour la Préparation des Opérations Aérienne - CASPOA).
- The Military Air traffic Control (Direction de la Circulation Aérienne Militaire - DirCAM).
- The Meteorology Center for External Operations (Centre de Météorologie des Opérations Extérieures - CMOE)

== Other facilities ==
A similar Air Force facility exists northwest of Lyon at BA942 Lyon-Mont Verdun. The French Navy's counterpart facility, controlling the ballistic missile submarine strike force (Force océanique stratégique - FOST), was located about 20 km to the south at Houilles, Yvelines.
