= Escadron de Chasse 1/4 Dauphiné =

Escadron de chasse 01-004
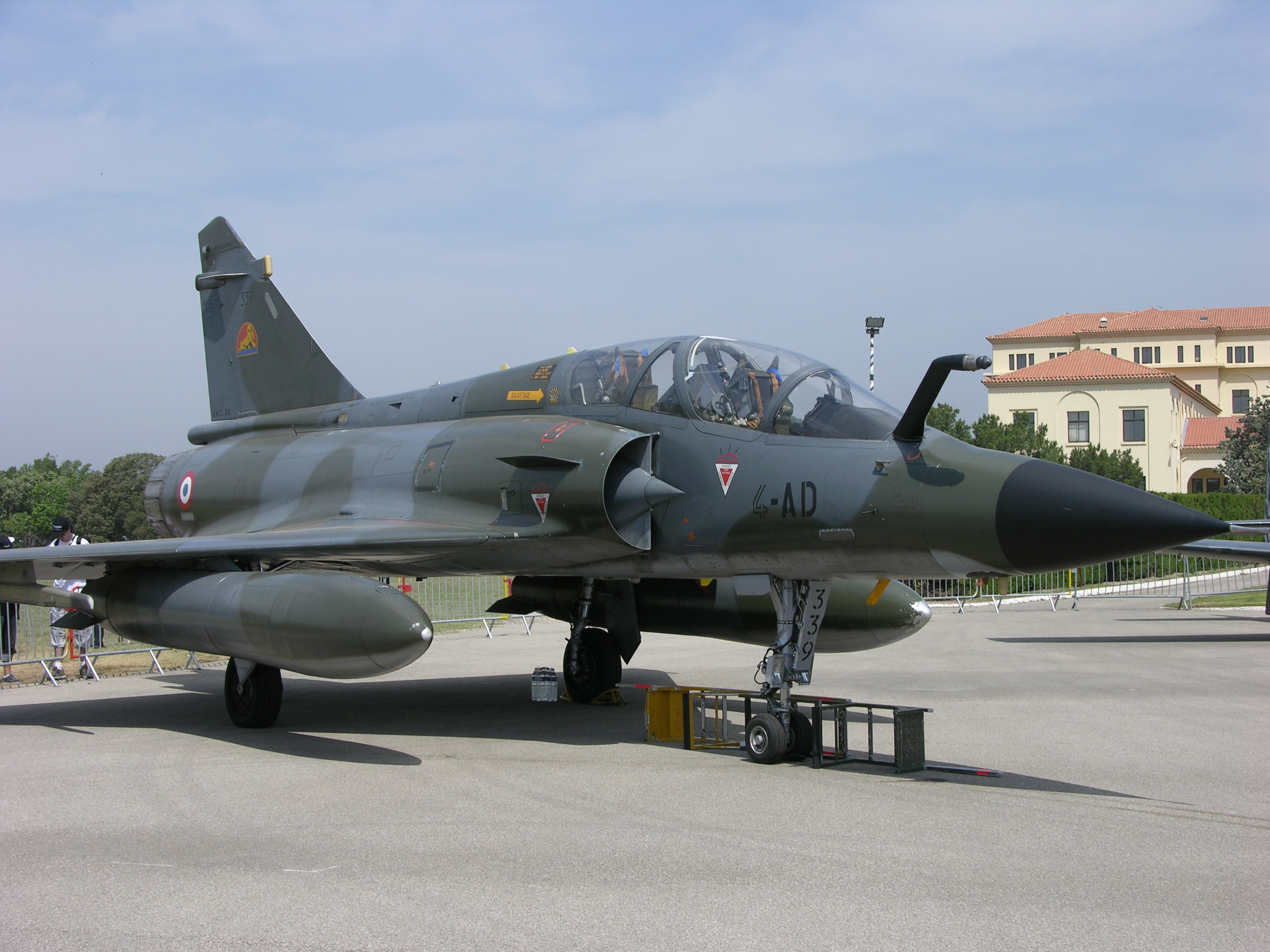
- The 'N' version of the Mirage 2000 was originally the nuclear attack version but many of them no longer have this capability
- Active: 1947-2010
- Disbanded: 19 June 2010
- Country: France
- Branch: French Air Force
- Role: Fighter
- Nickname(s): Dauphiné French Dauphiny

Aircraft flown
- Fighter: See #Aircraft below

Fighter Squadron 01-004 "Dauphiny" (French language: Escadron de chasse 01-004 "Dauphiné"), or EC 1/4, was a French Air Force squadron, last based at Air Base 116 Luxeuil-Saint Sauveur.

== History ==
The squadron was founded on 1 July 1947 to carry on the tradition of Fighter Group II/3. While initially stationed in Koblenz, Germany, the squadron was soon disembarked through Marseille to participate in operations in French Indochina. The first mission in that theater was undertaken on 18 September 1947, and the unit continued operations for 16 months until it returned to Europe. Based in Germany from 1949 to 1961, the squadron was moved to Air Base 116 Luxeuil in France where it would remain until it was disbanded.

In 1972, the squadron was assigned the additional mission of tactical nuclear weapons delivery. Upon the dissolving of the 4th Wing which the squadron was a part of on 1 September 1991, the squadron was transferred to the direct control of the Strategic Air Forces Command, and within a few years, its primary mission became strategic nuclear strike.For this it was equipped with the Mirage 2000N armed with the ASMP missile.

The squadron was disbanded on 29 June 2010.

== Flights ==
- SPA 37 "Charognard"
- SPA 81 "Lévrier"
- SPA 92 "Lion de Belfort"

== Bases ==
- BA 194 Nha Trang
- BA 136 Friedrichshafen
- BA 136 Bremgarten
- BA 116 Luxeuil-Saint Sauveur

== Aircraft ==
- 1947-1948: Supermarine Spitfire
- 1949: Republic P-47 Thunderbolt
- 1949-1953: de Havilland Vampire
- 1954-1957: Dassault Ouragan
- 1957-1967: Republic F-84 Thunderstreak
- 1967-1988: Dassault Mirage IIIE
- 1988-2010: Dassault Mirage 2000N

== See also ==
- List of French Air and Space Force aircraft squadrons
