= Escadron de Chasse 1/4 Gascogne =

- Active: April 1, 1937 – present
- Country: France
- Branch: French Air and Space Force
- Type: Fighter
- Role: Force de dissuasion (Nuclear deterrence)
- Part of: Strategic Air Forces; 4th Escadre de Chasse
- Garrison/HQ: BA 113 Saint-Dizier – Robinson Air Base

Aircraft flown
- Fighter: Dassault Rafale

Escadron de Chasse 1/4 Gascogne is a squadron of the French Air and Space Force. It houses the Dassault Rafale and was the second unit of the French Air and Space Force to receive the aircraft.

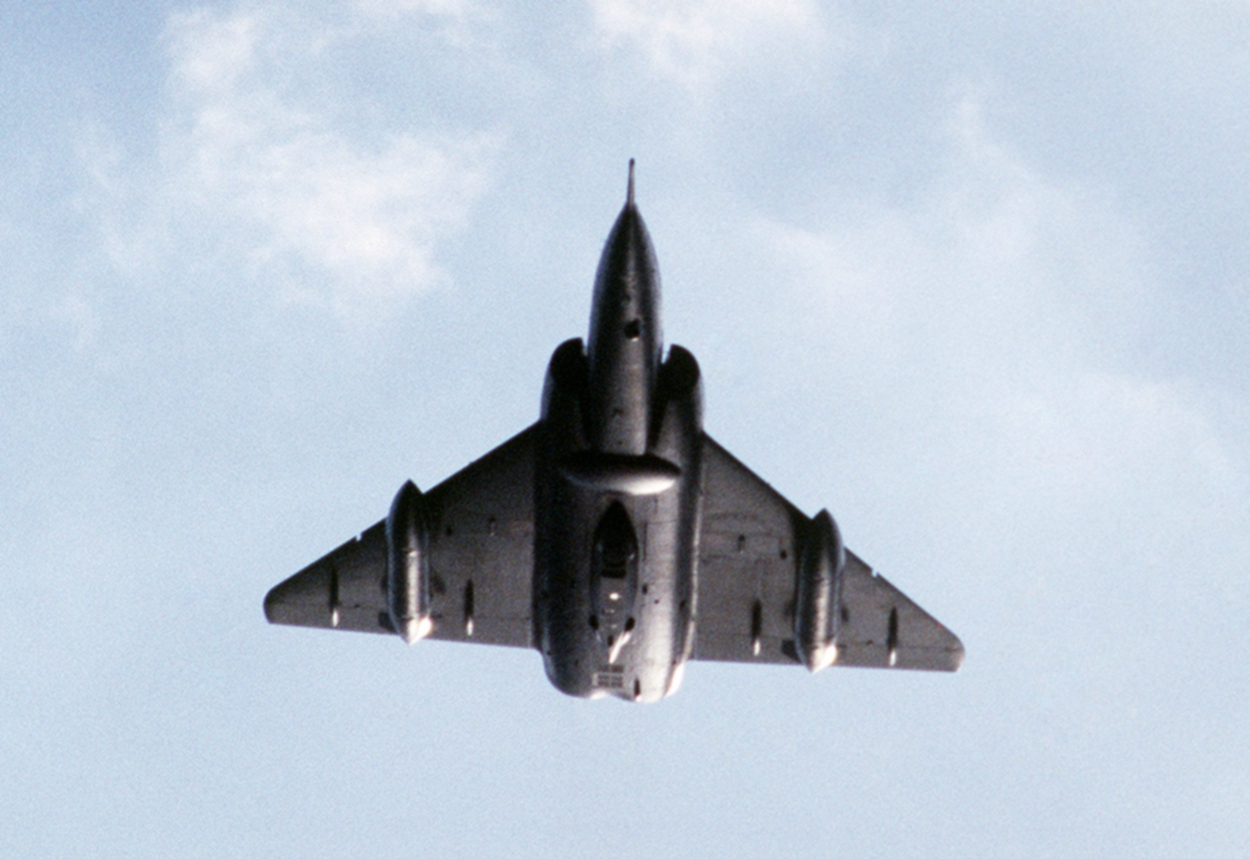
Mirage IV A, Escadron de Bombardement EB 1/91 "Gascogne", 1986

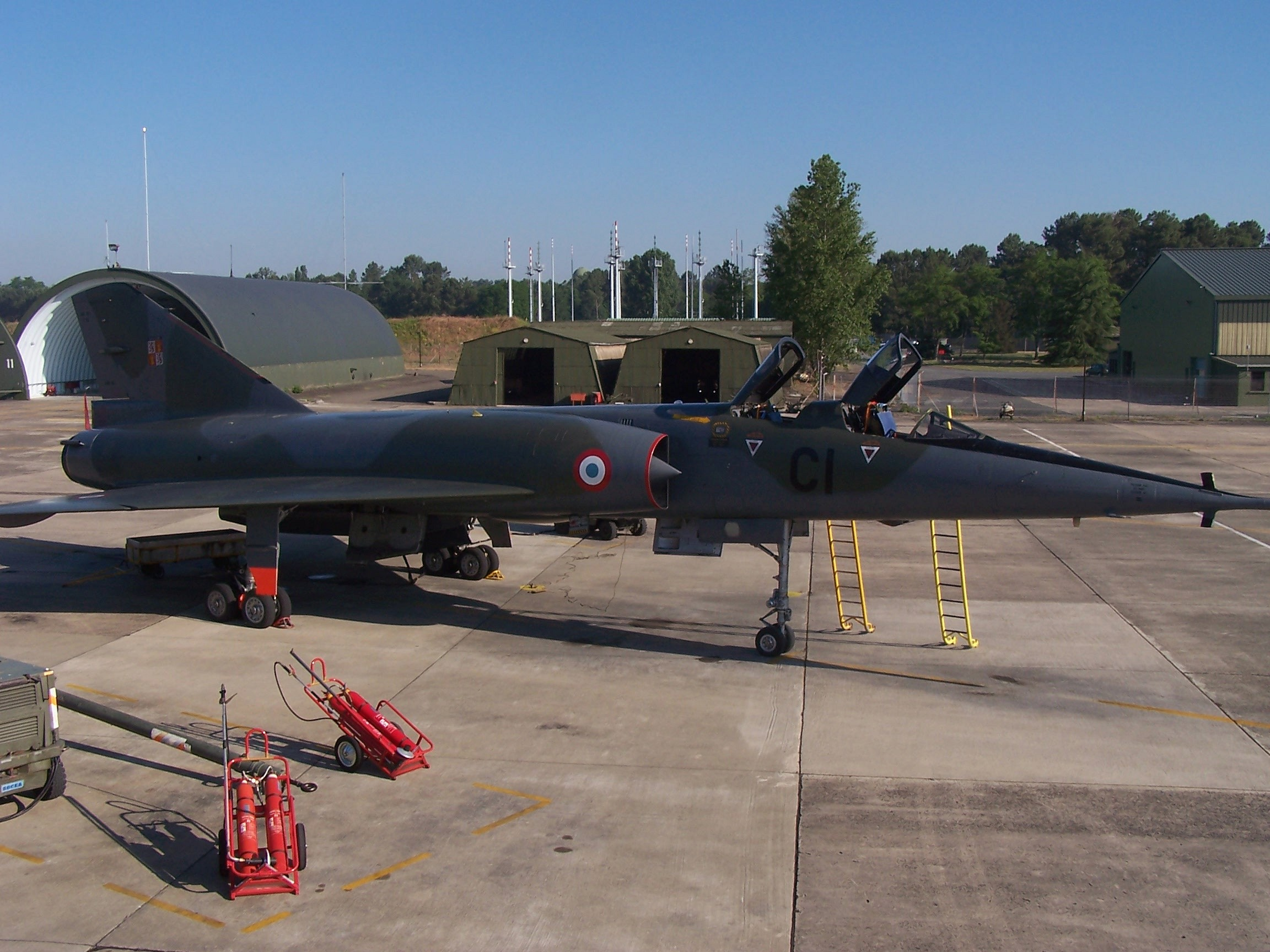
Mirage IV P, Escadron de Bombardement 1/91 Gascogne

== History ==
=== 3rd Reconstitution and nuclear era ===
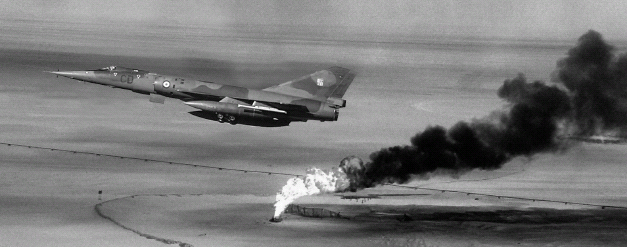
Mirage IV of Escadron de Bombardement 1/91 Gascogne above an oil field in flames, 1991 following the Gulf War

On May 10, 1966, a Mirage IVA n°36 of the squadron conducted the first transatlantic flight with a combat aircraft at French reaction under the command of Commandant Dubroca and Captain Caubert in 7 hours and 40 minutes, in which three air supply aircraft reached Boston.

=== End of the Mirage IV ===
On June 23, 2005, Mirage IV P n°59 conducted the last flight of Mirage IV of the squadron and the French Air Force, at the command of a commandant, operations chief of Gascogne. This aircraft was at Creil Airbase (BA110) (closed in 2016) but not on public display.

The Escadron de chasse 1/91 Gascogne was credited with dropping 120 bombs and conducted 368 missions in Libya during Opération Harmattan.

=== Rafale ===
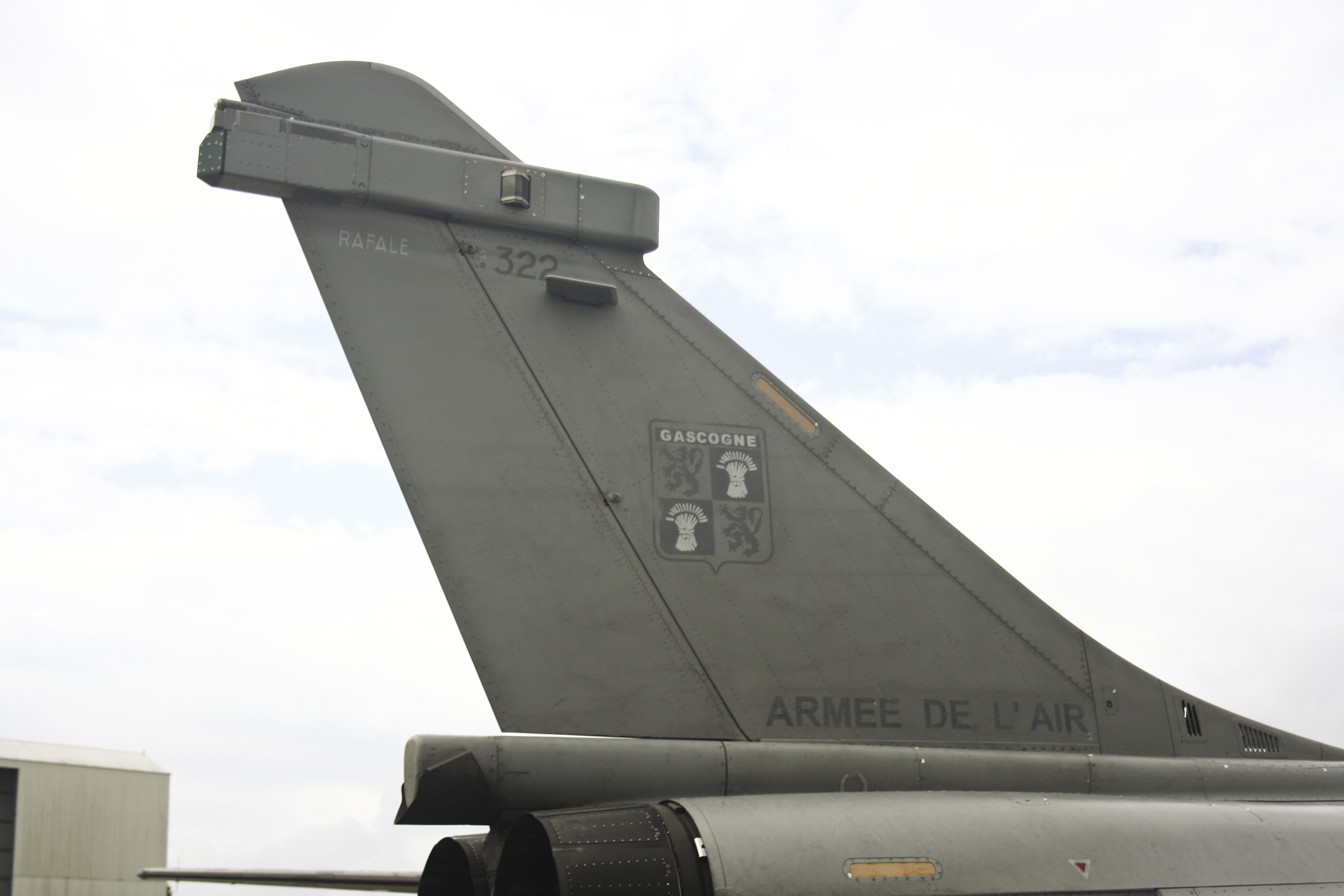
Rafale B (serial 322) bearing the insignia of the 1/91 Gascogne

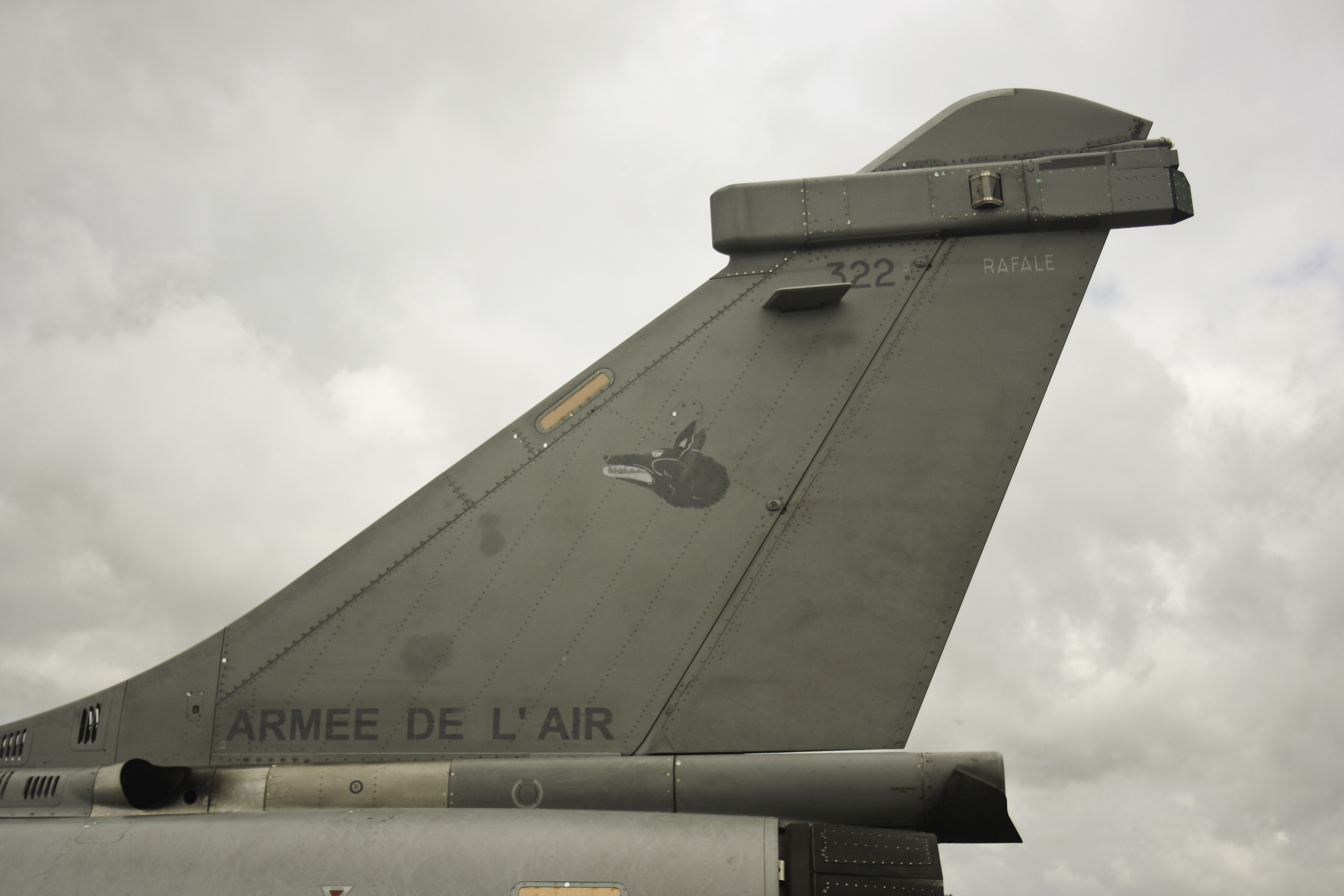
Rafale B (serial 322) of the 1/91 Gascogne bearing the insignia of SPA 79

The squadron was reformed on March 31, 2009, and equipped with Rafale, the unit integrated the Strategic Air Forces. From August 31, 2015, to September 18, 2015, 15 Rafale of the Escadron de chasse 1/7 Provence, Escadron de Chasse 2/30 Normandie-Niemen, and the 1/91 Gascogne were deployed to conduct an air-to-air campaign.

== Unit awards ==
=== Operation Harmattan, then Unified Protector (2011) ===
- EC 1/91 Gascogne obtained a cross a citation at the orders of the Aerial Army.

== Designations ==
- Groupe de Bombardement II/19: April 1, 1937 – September 1, 1940, (GB II/19)
- Groupe de Bombardement I/19: September 1, 1940 – February 21, 1944, (GB I/19)
- Groupe de Bombardement I/19 Gascogne: February 21, 1944 – November 1, 1955, (GB I/19 Gascogne)
- Groupe de Bombardement 1/91 Gascogne: September 1, 1956 – September 17, 1962, (GB 1/19 Gascogne)
- Escadron de Bombardement 1/91 Gascogne: June 1, 1964 – July 1, 1996, (EB 1/91 Gascogne)
- Escadron de Reconnaissance Stratégique 1/91 Gascogne: July 1, 1996 – June 23, 2005, (ERS 1/91 Gascogne)
- Escadron de Chasse 1/91 Gascogne: March 31, 2009 – September 1, 2016, (EC 1/91 Gascogne)
- Escadron de Chasse 1/4 Gascogne: since September 1, 2016 (EC 1/4 Gascogne)

== Equipment ==
- Potez 540 (1935 - 1937)
- Bloch MB.210 (1937-1940)
- Douglas DB-7 (1940 - 1944)
- Martin B-26 Marauder (1944–1946)
- Douglas A-26 Invader (1951–1962)
- Dassault Mirage IVA then IVP (1964–2005)
- Dassault Rafale (since 2009)

== See also ==
- List of French Air and Space Force aircraft squadrons
- History of the Armée de l'Air (1909–1942)
- Aviation in World War I
