= List of Escadres of the French Air and Space Force =

This is a list of Escadres (Wings) of the French Air and Space Force.

Escadres (wings) are commanded by a Lieutenant-colonel or Colonel, known as the "Chief de corps". The term Escadre replaced "regiment" in 1932. Until 1994, it meant a unit composed of several squadron-sized units (Escadron/Squadron or Groups), generally equipped with the same type of equipment, or at least the same type of mission (e.g. fighter, reconnaissance, bombing, transport) as well as wing maintenance and support units or sub-units.

Between 1993 and 1995, under the « Armées 2000 » reorganisation, the Escadre (wing) level of command was withdrawn from use. In 2014 it was reintroduced, with additions.

Former and active French Air Force escadrilles (squadrons) form the following former and active Escadres, as of June 14, 2015, (10 years, 313 days):

== Active Escadres ==
The list of active Escadres as of 2018 includes:

Strategic Air Forces Command

- 4th Fighter Wing (French: 4^{e}Escadre de chasse), recreated on August 26, 2015, at BA113 Saint-Dizier – Robinson Air Base, operates Dassault Rafale fighters in the nuclear strike role
- 31st Aerial Refueling and Strategic Transport Wing (French: 31^{e} Escadre aérienne de ravitaillement et de transport stratégiques), created on August 27, 2014, at BA125 Istres-Le Tubé Air Base, operates Boeing C-135FR/KC-135R Stratotanker in process of conversion to Airbus A330 MRTT

Air Forces Command

- Fighter Aviation Air Force Brigade (French: Brigade Aérienne de l'Aviation de Chasse (BAAC))
  - 2nd Fighter Wing (French: 2^{e} Escadre de chasse), recreated on September 3, 2015, at BA116 Luxeuil-Saint Sauveur Air Base, operates Dassault Mirage 2000-5F air defence fighters
  - 3rd Fighter Wing (French: 3^{e} Escadre de chasse), recreated on September 5, 2014, at BA133 Nancy – Ochey Air Base, operates Dassault Mirage 2000D fighter-bombers
  - 5th Fighter Wing (French: 5^{e} Escadre de chasse), recreated on July 18, 2024, at Base Aérienne 115 Orange-Caritat, operates Dassault Rafale C and B fighters in the tactical fighter role.
  - 8th Fighter Wing (French: 8^{e} Escadre de chasse), recreated on August 25, 2015, at BA120 Cazaux Air Base, operates Dassault Alpha Jet in the advanced jet and tactical training roles
  - 30th Fighter Wing (French: 30^{e} Escadre de chasse), recreated on September 3, 2015, at BA118 Mont-de-Marsan Air Base, operates Dassault Rafale fighters in the tactical fighter and operational evaluation roles
- Support and Projection Air Force Brigade (French: Brigade Aérienne d'Appui et de Projection (BAAP))
  - 61st Transport Wing (French: 61^{e} Escadre de transport), recreated on September 1, 2015, at BA123 Orléans – Bricy Air Base, operates Airbus A400M Atlas and Lockheed C-130H/H-30 Hercules tactical transport aircraft
  - 64th Transport Wing (French: 64^{e} Escadre de transport), recreated on August 27, 2015, at BA 105 Évreux-Fauville Air Base, operates CASA/ITPN CN-235-200M/-300M tactical transport and SAAB 340 aircraft (waiting for the Falcon ARCHANGE)
- Airspace Control Air Force Brigade (French: Brigade Aérienne de Contrôle de l'Espace (BACE))
  - 36th Airborne Command and Control Wing (French: 36^{e} Escadre de commandement et de conduite aéroportée), created on September 3, 2014, at BA702 Avord Air Base, operates Boeing E-3F Sentry AEW&C aircraft
  - Surface-to-Air Air Defence Wing - 1st Anti-Aircraft Artillery Regiment (French: Escadre sol-air de défense aérienne - 1^{er} Régiment d’Artillerie de l’Air), created on September 3, 2014, at BA702 Avord Air Base, operates SAMP/T in the air defence and ballistic missile defence role
- Aviation Maneuver Support Air Force Brigade (French: Brigade aérienne d’appui à la manœuvre aérienne (BAAMA))
  - Deployable Command and Control Air Force Wing (French: Escadre aérienne de commandement et de conduite projectable), created on August 27, 2015, at BA105 Évreux-Fauville Air Base, operates ground-based Command and control C4I systems

== Former Escadres ==
=== Escadres de Bombardement/ Bombardment Escadres ===
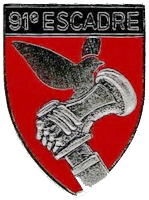
91^{e}EB.

- 90e Escadre de Bombardement (French: 90^{e} Escadre de Bombardement)
- 91e Escadre de Bombardement (French: 91^{e} Escadre de Bombardement)
- 92e Escadre de Bombardement (French: 92^{e} Escadre de Bombardement)
- 93e Escadre de Bombardement (French: 93^{e} Escadre de Bombardement)
- 94e Escadre de Bombardement (French: 94^{e} Escadre de Bombardement)

=== Escadres de Chasse/Fighter Squadron ===
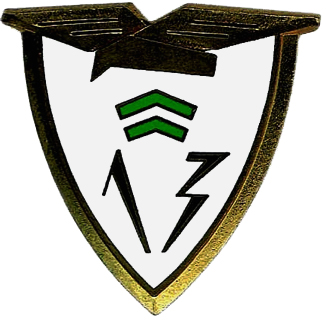
insignia of the 13^{e} EC.

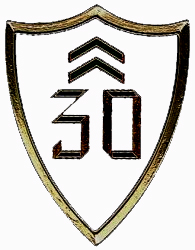
insginia of the 30^{e} EC.

- 1re Escadre de Chasse (French: 1^{re} Escadre de Chasse)
- 5e Escadre de Chasse (French: 5^{e} Escadre de Chasse)
- 6e Escadre de Chasse (French: 6^{e} Escadre de Chasse)
- 7e Escadre de Chasse (French: 7^{e} Escadre de Chasse)
- 9e Escadre de Chasse (French: 9^{e} Escadre de Chasse)
- 10e Escadre de Chasse (French: 10^{e} Escadre de Chasse)
- 11e Escadre de Chasse (French: 11^{e} Escadre de Chasse)
- 12e Escadre de Chasse (French: 12^{e} Escadre de Chasse)
- 13e Escadre de Chasse (French: 13^{e} Escadre de Chasse)
- 20e Escadre de Chasse (French: 20^{e} Escadre de Chasse)
- 21e Escadre de Chasse (French: 21^{e} Escadre de Chasse)

=== Escadre de Missiles/ Missiles Escadres ===
- 95e Escadre de Missiles Stratégiques (French: 95^{e} Escadre de Missiles Stratégiques)

=== Escadres de Reconnaissance/ Reconnaissance Escadres ===
- 33e Escadre de Reconnaissance (French: 33^{e} Escadre de Reconnaissance)

=== Escadres de Transport/ Transport Escadre ===
- 62e Escadre de Transport (French: 62^{e} Escadre de Transport)
- 63e Escadre de Transport (French: 63^{e} Escadre de Transport)
- 65e Escadre de Transport (French: 65^{e} Escadre de Transport)

=== Escadres d'Hélicoptères/ Helicopter Escadres ===
- 22e Escadre d'Hélicoptères (French: 22^{e} Escadre d'Hélicoptères)
- 23e Escadre d'Hélicoptères (French: 23^{e} Escadre d'Hélicoptères)

== See also ==
- Major (France)
- Chief of Staff of the French Air Force
- Strategic Air Forces
- History of the Armée de l'Air (1909–42)
- History of the Armée de l'Air in the colonies (1939–62)
- List of French Air and Space Force aircraft squadrons
- List of French Air and Space Force bases
