= Strategic Air Forces Command =

Command of the French Air and Space Force

Forces Aériennes Stratégiques (FAS) Strategic Air Forces
- Active: 14 January 1964 – present
- Branch: French Air and Space Force
- Type: Major command
- Role: Nuclear deterrence
- Size: ~ 2,000 personnel (2017)
- Garrison/HQ: Taverny Air Base (1964–2007, 2024–present); Lyon – Mont Verdun Air Base (2007–2024)

The Strategic Air Forces (French: Forces Aériennes Stratégiques, FAS; Commandement des Forces Aériennes Stratégiques, CFAS or COMFAS) is a command of the French Air and Space Force. It was created on 14 January 1964, and directs France's nuclear bombardment force. The headquarters are at Taverny Air Base.

Général de division aérienne Stéphane Virem was appointed commander on 16 September 2024, having been appointed deputy commander in 2023. He took over from General Jérôme Bellanger, in command from 2021 to 2024, who was appointed Chief of Staff of the French Air and Space Force.

== History ==
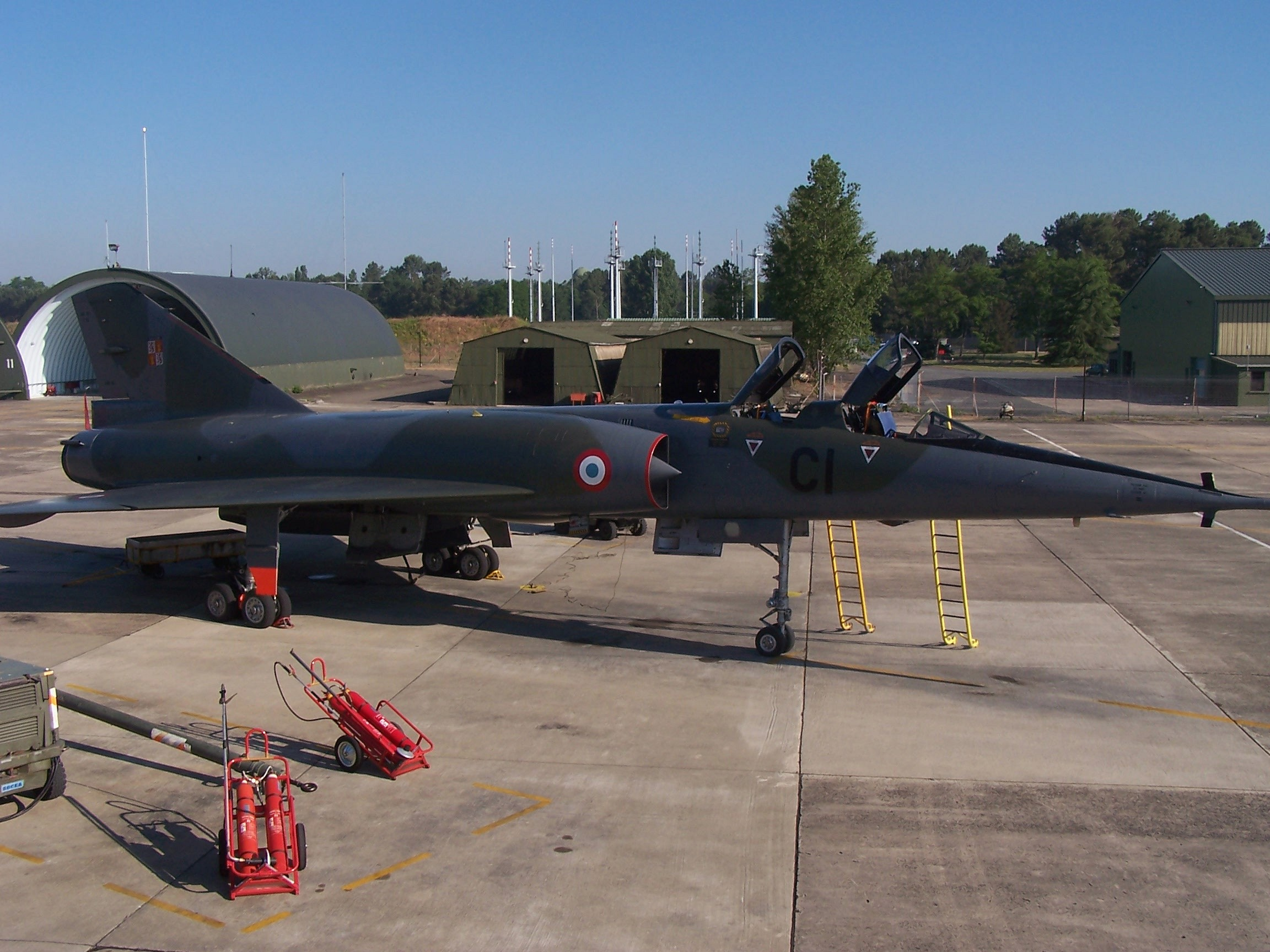
Mirage IVP of Escadron de Bombardement 1/91 Gascogne

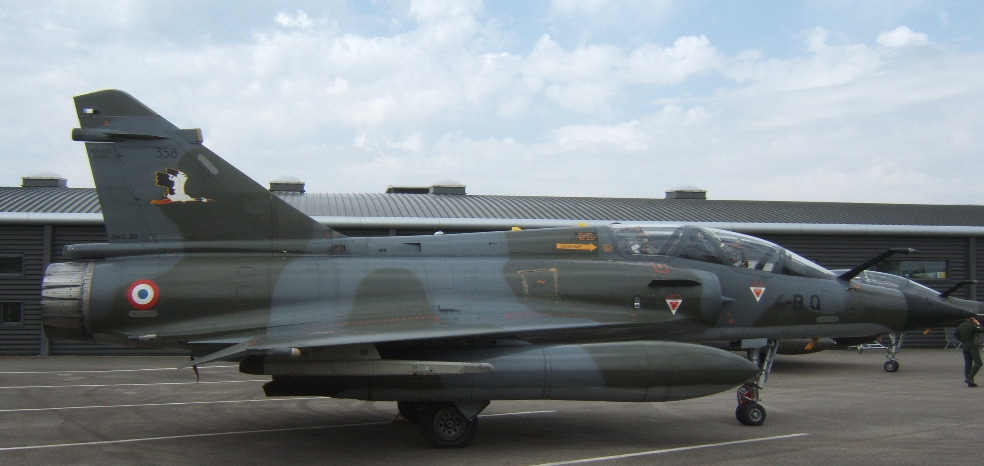
Mirage 2000N

Initially, the Force de frappe consisted of only of the 92 Bombardment Wing (Escadre), established in 1955 and operating 40 Sud Aviation Vautour IIB bombers. These were considered marginal for a strategic bomber role and work began almost immediately on a replacement. In May 1956 a requirement for what became the Dassault Mirage IV bomber was drawn up; this bomber was designed to carry nuclear gravity bombs over targets in the Eastern bloc at supersonic speeds and was declared operational in October 1964.

In May 1964, Genéral Marie, FAS commander, was replaced by Général Philippe Maurin, former commander of the Tactical Air Forces (FATAC). General Maurin later became French Air Force chief of staff in 1967.

The first alert by a Dassault Mirage IV armed with AN-11 bombs, and a Boeing KC-135 Stratotanker was executed on October 8, 1964: from that point, a permanent alert was maintained. In addition, the French aircraft carrier Verdun was envisaged to have deployed bomber aircraft at sea.

In April 1965, an intermediate-range ballistic missile launch base, part of the Strategic Air Forces was established. It was set up on the plateau d'Albion, Air Base 200 Apt-Saint-Christol (French: base aérienne 200 Apt-Saint-Christol) and equipped with underground launch missile silos. It was operational from August 2, 1971, until dismantling on September 16, 1996.

In the spring of 1966, the deterrent force reached the strength of nine squadrons. In 1973, this deterrence force comprised 60 Mirage IV spread out among nine bases in metropolitan France.

The Mirage IV-P version armed with the Air-sol moyenne portée (ASMP-A) missile entered service in 1986. From 1988, Mirage 2000N began to enter service. All bomber versions of the Mirage IV were retired by 1996.

Since the 1990s, Strategic Air Forces aircraft may also be tasked to carry out conventional air strikes as part of France's exterior military operations.

== Structure ==
From 1963 to 2007, the Strategic Air Forces were headquartered at an underground command centre, which also welcomed the same year the Operations Center of the Strategic Air Forces (French: Centre d’Opérations des Forces Aériennes Stratégiques, COFAS). The command post was built 50 meters under the ground, with a fallout shelter destined for the executive power in case of nuclear war; this command post was in full use in 1967. In 1968, CFAS headquarters was located at Taverny Air Base (BA 921) under the Montmorency Forest.

In 1968, at the peak of the highest alert phases, 62 Mirage IV (out of which nine were on operational alert and capable of takeoff in 5 minutes while the remainder would follow within the hour, with the alert phase readiness increasing to 15 minutes, from 1964 until 1990 respectively) equipped three bomb wings (escadre), the 91^{e} Escadre de Bombardement; the 93^{e} Escadre de Bombardement; and the 94^{e} Escadre de Bombardement; with a total of nine squadrons and a training center:

- EB 1/91 « Gascogne » formed 1 October 1964 at Air Base 118 Mont-de-Marsan at Mont-de-Marsan
- EB 2/94 « Marne » (French: Escadron de Bombardement 2/94 Marne) formed 24 February 1965 at Saint-Dizier Air Base
- EB 2/91 « Bretagne » at Cazaux Air Base (BA 120) at Cazaux. Formed 1 April 1965, dissolved in July 1996.
- EB 3/91 « Beauvaisis » (French: Escadron de Bombardement 3/91 Beauvaisis) formed 1 June 1965 at Creil Air Base (BA 110). Dissolved 30 June 1976.
- EB 3/93 « Sambre » le 6 July 1965 at Cambrai Air Base at Cambrai. Dissolved 30 June 1976.
- EB 2/93 « Cevennes » formed 31 July 1965 at BA 115 at Orange. Later redesignated « EB 3/91 Cévennes », the Escadron/Squadron was dissolved in 1983.
- EB 1/93 « Guyenne » le 15 October 1965 at Istres-Le Tube Air Base at Istres. Redesignated EB 1/94 on 30 June 1976 and transferred to Avord Air Base.
- EB 1/94 « Bourbonnais » on 1 March 1966 at Avord Air Base at Avord. Dissolved on 30 June 1976
- EB 3/94 « Arbois » (French: Escadron de bombardement 3/94 Arbois) on 1 June 1966 at Aerial Base 116 Luxeuil-Saint Sauveur (BA 116) at Luxeuil
- Instruction Center of Strategic Air Forces 328 (French: Centre d'instruction des Forces aériennes stratégiques 328 (CIFAS)) created on 25 at Bordeaux-Mérignac Air Base

Aerial refuelling support was provided by 12 Boeing C-135F aircraft (of which 3 were on operational alert) in 3 squadrons (ERV):

- ERV 4/91 « Landes » created on 1 January 1964 at Mont-de-Marsan Air Base (BA 118) at Mont-de-Marsan
- ERV 4/93 « Aunis » created on 13 July 1965 on Aerial Base 125 Istres-Le Tubé at Istres. Later became ERV 4/94 « Bretagne »
- ERV 4/94 « Sologne » created on 15 April 1966 at Avord Air Base (BA 702) at Avord.

In addition to the command, can be added Aerial Base Apt-Saint-Christol (BA 200). BA 200 was created in April 1967 under the Plateau d'Albion.

Independent from the Strategic Air Forces (French: Forces Aériennes Stratégiques, FAS), several installations were utilized by the latter:

- The center of experimentation of the Pacific (CEP) in French Polynesia, created on July 1, 1963, composed of:
  - one headquarter staff Papeete,
  - advanced Aerial Base 185 Hao (French: BA 185) at Hao created on July 1, 1966, and dissolved in 2000,
  - one testing surface area at Moruroa
  - one testing surface area at Fangataufa

In 1985, CFAS had two squadrons of S-3 IRBMs at the Plateau d'Albion, six squadrons of Mirage IVAs (at Mont de Marsan, Cazaux, Orange, Istres, St Dizier, and EB 3/94 at Luxeuil), and three squadrons of KC-135Fs, as well as the training/reconnaissance unit, CIFAS 328, at Bordeaux.

On 16 July 1999, BA 200 on the Plateau d'Albion was transferred and renamed as Quartier Maréchal Kœnig, to house the 2nd Foreign Engineer Regiment (2e REG) and the bi-static space surveillance station GRAVES of the General Directorate for External Security.

FAS Headquarters was moved on 26 September 2007 from Taverny to Air Base 942 Lyon – Mont Verdun under Mount Verdun. Lyon – Mont Verdun was originally a secondary operations centre.

In 2008, 60 Mirage 2000N of the Strategic Air Forces were stationed at two airbases.

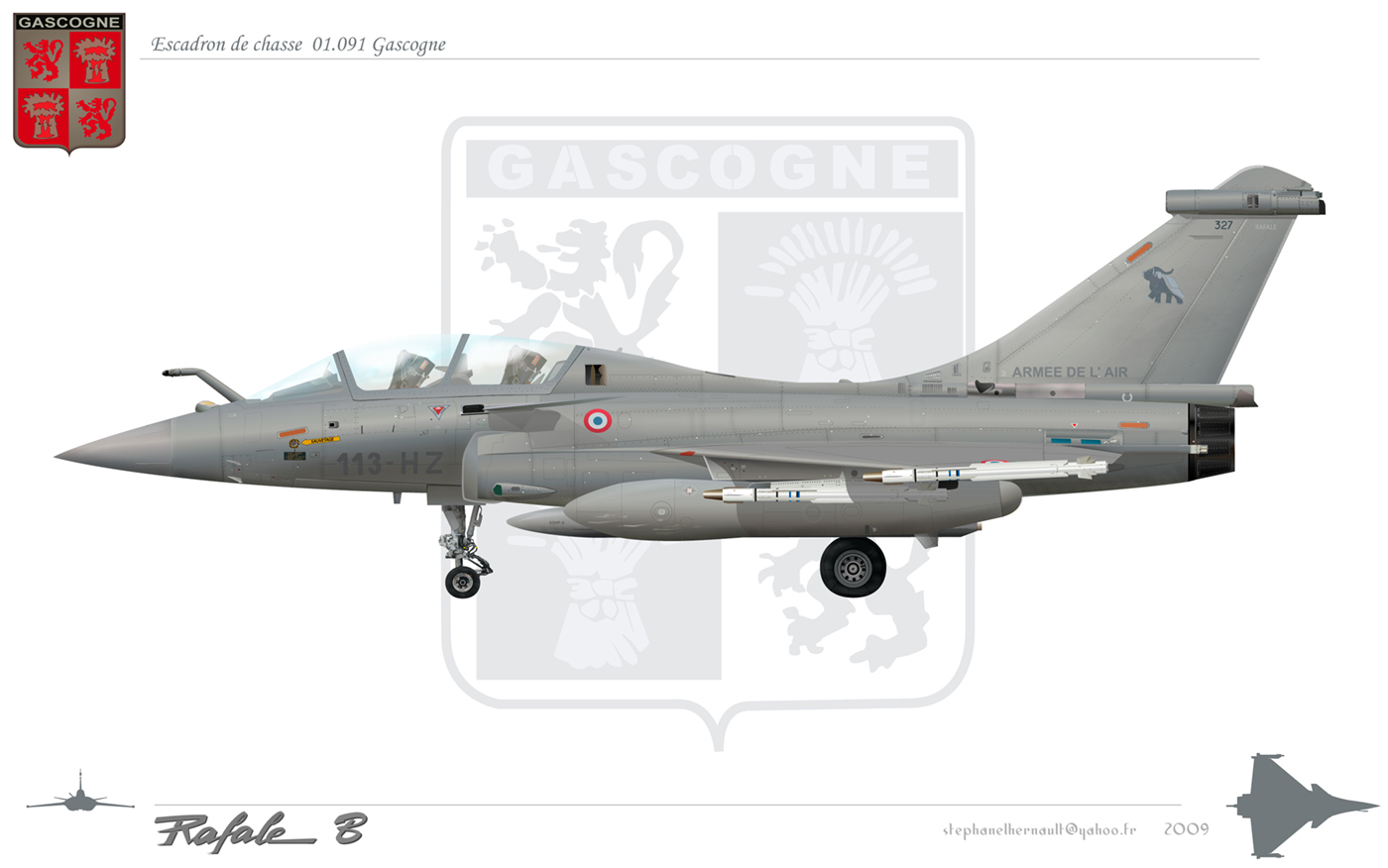
Rafale B of the Escadron "Gascogne" & ASMP-A.

In 2014, the Strategic Air Forces comprise two nuclear squadrons with more than 43 aircraft, numbering around 1,400 personnel:

- Escadron de Chasse 1/4 Gascogne (French: Escadron de Chasse 1/4 Gascogne) at Saint-Dizier – Robinson Air Base, armed with more than 20 Rafale B aircraft.
- Escadron de Chasse 2/4 La Fayette (French: Escadron de Chasse 2/4 La Fayette) at Istres-Le Tubé Air Base, armed with more than 20 Mirage 2000N aircraft.

The Mirage 2000N was planned to be retired from service in September 2018, with the La Fayette Squadron converting to Rafale B. Both fighter squadrons were to be stationed at Saint-Dizier – Robinson Air Base in order to improve training and logistics. Forward operating locations for dispersion of nuclear-armed Rafale flights will be retained at other air bases, in line with the French redundancy practice to prevent taking out the aerial nuclear arm with a single massive strike.

The Groupe de Ravitaillement en Vol 02.091 Bretagne operating 14 Boeing KC-135 Stratotankers is also part of the FAS. These aircraft will be replaced by 12 Airbus A330 MRTT « Phénix » between 2018 and 2025.

=== Nuclear arms depots ===
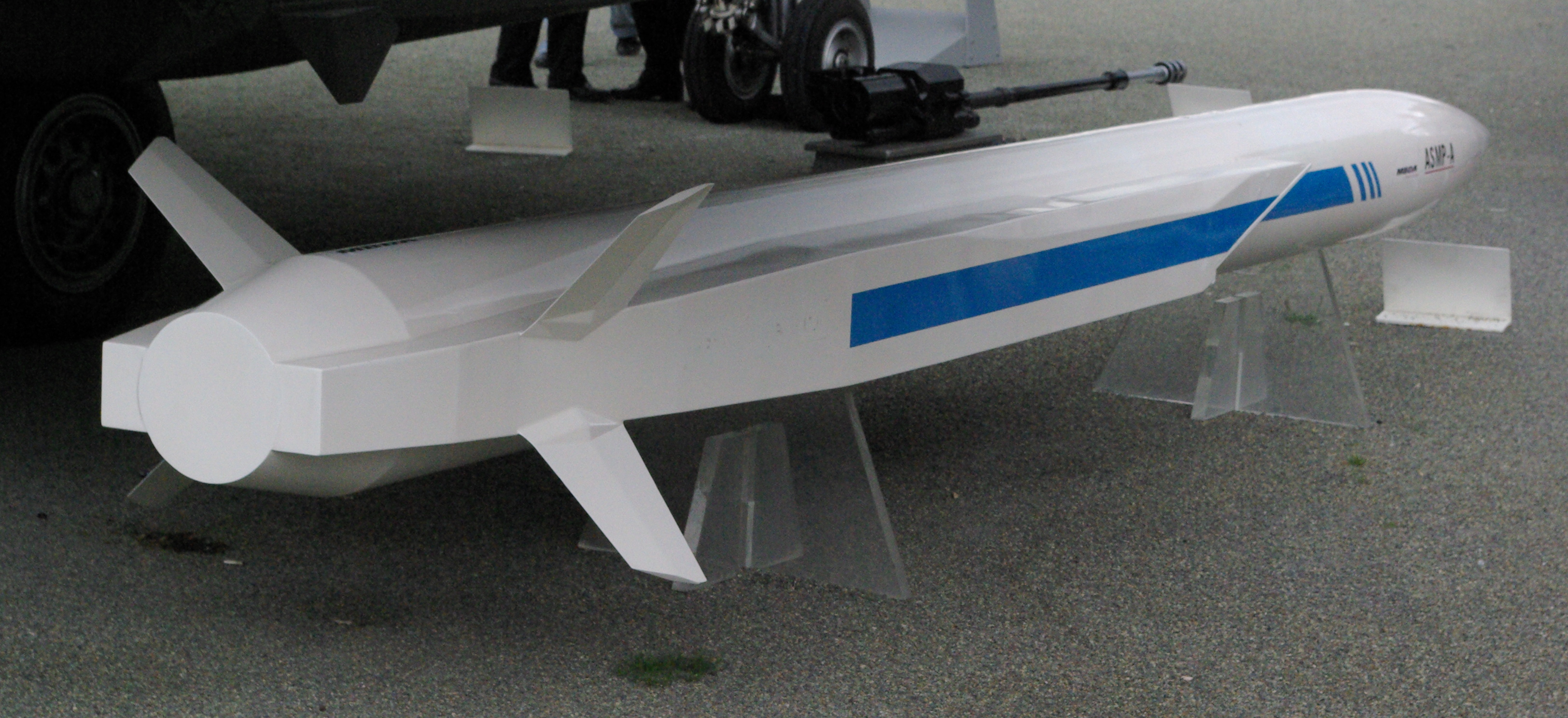
A scale maquette of the ASMP-A

Between 1986 and 1989, the numerous AN-22 bombs equipping the Dassault Mirage IV bombers were withdrawn and a new generation of airborne missile (ASMP-A) arms were placed in service. These missiles are stocked in various designated special munitions depots (French: Dépôts Ateliers Munitions Spéciales, DAMS), which are highly protected sites on different aerial bases.

As of 2010, the Air-sol moyenne portée (ASMP-A) of new generation is destined for the Strategic Air Forces (FAS) of the French Air Force and the French Naval Nuclear Force (French: Force Aéronavale Nucléaire, FANU) of the French Navy (Marine nationale). The new equipment (Tête Nucléaire Aéroportée, TNA) is of an estimated power mass of 300 kt.

As of end of 2008 and until 2012, depots were reorganized at the occasion of the arrival of the ASMP-A missile to be re-baptized under another ASMP-A depot vector (French: Dépôts vecteurs ASMP-A, DVA). The special munitions depot (Dépôts Ateliers Munitions Spéciales, DAMS) change frequently. The DVA is confined to the squadron during the placement in effect, while the TNA are handled differently, in a specialized zone that is well protected.

== Bibliography ==
- Serge Gadal, Forces Aériennes Stratégiques, préface de Nicolas Sarkozy, President of France, Economica, 2009 ISBN 978-2717857580
- Robert Galan, Forces Aériennes Stratégiques : missions au cœur du secret défense, Privat, collection Aviation, 2014 ISBN 978-2708992559, Réalisé en collaboration avec l’Association Nationale des anciens des Forces Aériennes Stratégiques (ANFAS)
- Hervé Beaumont, Les forces aériennes stratégiques 1964-2014, Histoire et Collections, collection Aviation, 2014 ISBN 978-2352503941
- Frédéric Lert & Hervé Beaumont, Les Forces Aériennes Stratégiques : 50 ans d’alerte nucléaire, Zéphyr Éditions, collection Prestige, 2015 ISBN 978-2361181680

=== Further reading ===
- Embassy of France in India, Strategic force projection of Rafales
