= Saint-Dizier – Robinson Air Base =

Air base in Saint-Dizier, France

Saint-Dizier - Robinson Air Base Base aérienne 113 Saint-Dizier-Robinson
- IATA: none; ICAO: LFSI

Summary
- Airport type: Military
- Owner: Government of France
- Operator: Armée de l'air et de l'espace
- Location: Saint-Dizier, France
- Elevation AMSL: 458 ft (140 m)
- Coordinates: 48°38′09″N 004°53′57″E

Map
- Location of air base in Grand Est region Location of airport in France

Runways
Direction	Length		Surface
Direction	m	ft	Surface
11/29	2,412	7,913	Asphalt

Saint-Dizier-Robinson Air Base (French: Base aérienne 113 Saint-Dizier) (ICAO: LFSI) is a front-line French Air and Space Force (Armée de l'air et de l'espace) fighter aircraft base located approximately 4 km (2 nautical miles) west of Saint-Dizier, in the Haute-Marne department of the Champagne-Ardenne region in northeastern France.

The base is at an elevation of 458 feet (140 m) above mean sea level. It has one runway designated 11/29 with an asphalt surface measuring 2,412 by 45 metres (7,913 ft × 148 ft).

== Units ==
- Escadron de Chasse 1/4 Gascogne with the Rafale B
- Escadron de Chasse 2/4 La Fayette with the Rafale B
- Escadron de Transformation Rafale 3/4 Aquitaine with the Rafale B and Rafale C

== History ==
Saint-Dizier has a long aviation history, with an early French military aircraft landing close to the city on 11 August 1910. An Armée de l'Air aerodrome was established in 1913, which remains in use, being used for combat operations during both 20th-Century World Wars.

Some of the pre-World War II French Air Force aircraft assigned to the base were Blériot Aéronautique, Morane-Saulnier, Stampe-Vertongen SV.4, de Havilland Tiger Moth and Dewoitine D.520s

=== German use during World War II ===
Seized by the Germans in June 1940 during the Battle of France, St. Dizier was used as a Luftwaffe military airfield during the occupation. Known units assigned (all from Luftlotte 3, Fliegerkorps IV):

- Jagdgeschwader 54 (JG 54) 29 March-1 April 1941 Messerschmitt Bf 109E
- Nachtjagdgeschwader 4 (NJG 4) February 1942-January 1944 Messerschmitt Bf 110, Dornier Do 217
- Jagdgeschwader 27 (JG 27) 12 September-18 November 1943 Messerschmitt Bf 109G
- Nachtjagdgeschwader 1 (NJG 1) March–May 1944 Messerschmitt Bf 110
- Nachtjagdgeschwader 5 (NJG 5) 4 May–August 1944 Messerschmitt Bf 110
- Kampfgeschwader 101 (KG 101) 10 June–July 1944 Junkers Ju 88A-4, Mistel
- Jagdgeschwader 301 (JG 301) 12–30 June 1944 Messerschmitt Bf 109G

JG 54 flew missions over England during the Battle of Britain; NJG 4, NJG 1, and NJG 5 were night interceptor units which attacked Royal Air Force bomber attacks. JG 27 and JG 301 were day interceptor units that engaged American Eighth Air Force heavy bomber units over Occupied France.

Largely due to its use as a base for Bf 109 interceptors, Saint-Dizier was attacked by USAAF Ninth Air Force Martin B-26 Marauder medium bombers and Republic P-47 Thunderbolts mostly with 500-pound general-purpose bombs; unguided rockets and .50 caliber machine gun sweeps when Eighth Air Force heavy bombers (Boeing B-17 Flying Fortresses, Consolidated B-24 Liberators) were within interception range of the Luftwaffe aircraft assigned to the base. The attacks were timed to have the maximum effect possible to keep the interceptors pinned down on the ground and be unable to attack the heavy bombers. Also the North American P-51 Mustang fighter-escort groups of Eighth Air Force would drop down on their return to England and attack the base with a fighter sweep and attack any target of opportunity to be found at the airfield.

=== American use ===
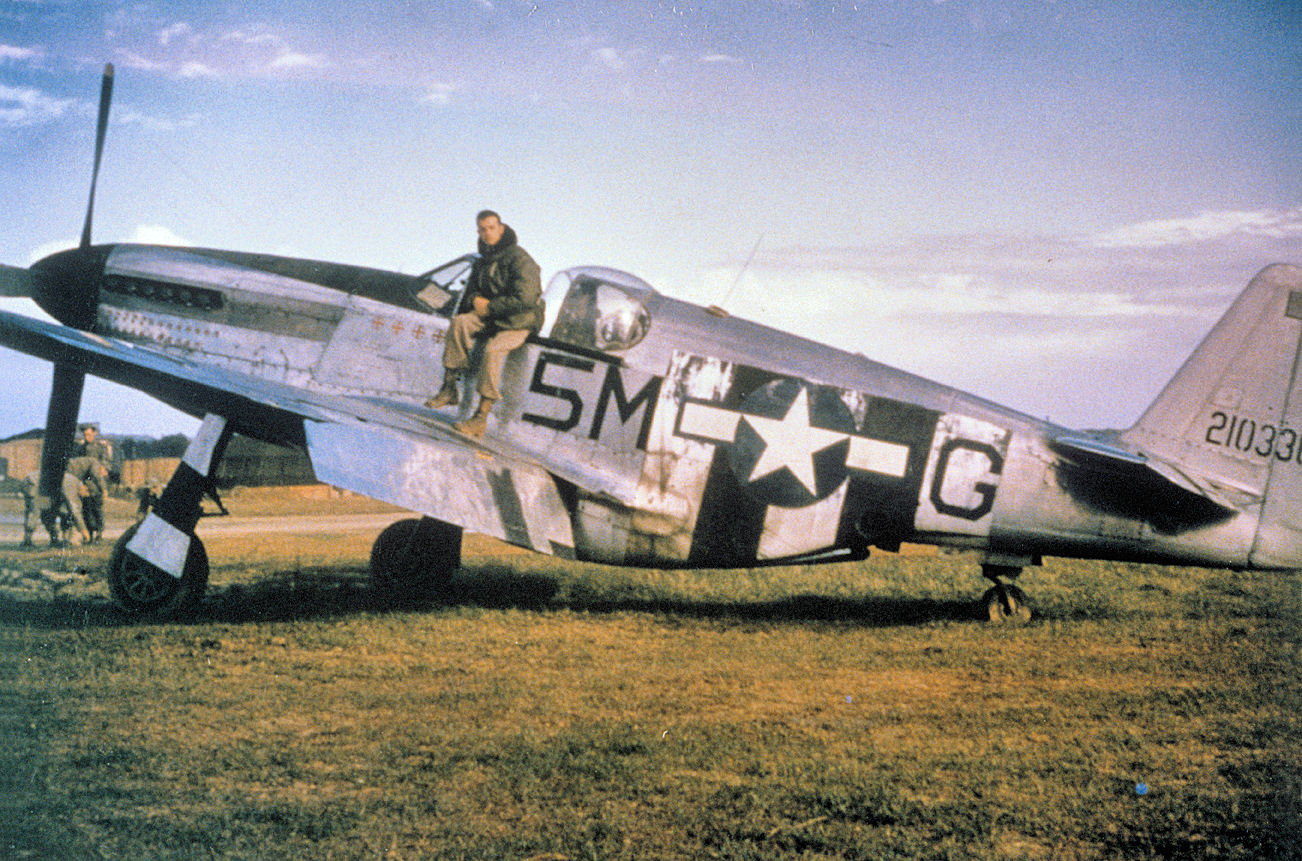
North American P-51C-5-NT Mustang (F-6C) Serial 42-103368 of the 15th Tactical Reconnaissance Squadron, 10th TRG at A-64, St. Dizler, France, Autumn 1944.

During the Liberation of France, the airfield was seized by Allied forces during September, 1944 and taken over by the United States Army Air Forces. The IX Engineer Command repaired the war-damaged base and it was designated by the Americans as Saint-Dizier Airfield or Advanced Landing Ground A-64. It was turned over to the Ninth Air Force for operational use on 9 October for fighter and reconnaissance units, as well as for command and control. The following known USAAF units operated from the airfield:

- HQ, 100th Fighter Wing, 19 September-29 December 1944.
- 27th Fighter Group, February–March 1945, P-47 Thunderbolt (12th AF)
- 367th Fighter Group, 1 February-14 May 1945, P-47 Thunderbolt
- 405th Fighter Group, 14 September 1944 – 9 February 1945, P-47 Thunderbolt
- 10th Reconnaissance Group, September–November 1944 (Various photo-reconnaissance aircraft)

With the end of the war in Europe in May, 1945 the Americans began to withdraw their aircraft and personnel. Right after the war, some captured Messerschmitt Me 262s landed at the base, on their way to channel ports to be shipped to the United States for evaluation (Operation Lusty). Control of the airfield was turned over to French authorities on 5 July.

In 1950-51 when as a result of the Cold War threat of the Soviet Union, Saint Dizier-Robinson Air Base was proposed by the United States Air Force to become a NATO light bomber air base as part of a NATO commitment to establish a modern air base at the site. In the ongoing negotiations, the site was ultimately rejected.

== Since 1945 ==
The war had left Saint-Dizier airbase in ruins, littered with rubble, debris, scrap metal and charred remains of airplanes. A number of aircraft remains and unexploded German munitions had been hastily bulldozed into bomb craters, all of which needed to be removed. The station area and the hangars and aircraft mechanical shops were devastated, also with huge quantities of unexploded munitions still littering the ground. The American combat engineers had carried out considerable repair work on the runway, and constructed temporary structures for repair and maintenance of aircraft, however the personnel lived in tents as repair of the barracks was not considered a priority for aircraft operations.

A new 8,000 feet (2,400 m) jet runway was laid down over the wartime 11/29 runway and the parking ramp was torn up and relaid with new concrete. Large, modern aircraft hangars were erected and a new station area built. The aircraft dispersal areas were also renewed, later in the 1970s being fitted with NATO Tab-Vee concrete hardened aircraft shelters. A second dispersal area to the north of the main runway was also built to accommodate a second full aircraft squadron. Reconstruction was finally completed in 1956.

Most wartime and pre-war buildings and structures were removed or demolished during the reconstruction. However, the remains of the pre-war 02/20 secondary runway can still be seen in aerial photography as unconnected concrete lengths running NE/SW over the airfield. Also what appears to be part of wartime taxiways are now used as access roads around the airfield's perimeter.

In 1973, EC 1/7 Provence became the first French Air force unit to be equipped with the SEPECAT Jaguar and relocated to Saint-Dizier-Robinson. The squadron's Jaguars engaged in combat missions in Mauritania (Opération Lamantin), in Chad (Operation Manta), in the Gulf War (Opération Daguet) and in Bosnia. Since 2006, BA 113 has had the Dassault Rafale B/C fighter assigned. It was the first base of the French Air Force to be assigned the aircraft. Escadron de Chasse 1/7 Provence, a long-established fighter squadron, flies the Rafale from the base. Escadron de Chasse 1/91 Gascogne also flies Rafales from the base.

== See also ==
- List of French Air and Space Force aircraft squadrons
- Advanced Landing Ground
