= United Nations Security Council Resolution 2016 =

UN Security Council Resolution 2016
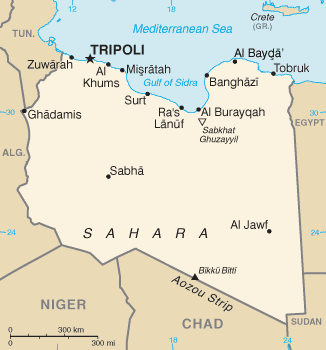
- Map of Libya
- Date: 27 October 2011
- Meeting no.: 6,640
- Code: S/RES/2016 (Document)
- Subject: Libyan Civil War
- Voting summary: 15 voted for; None voted against; None abstained
- Result: Adopted

Security Council composition
- Permanent members: China; France; Russia; United Kingdom; United States
- Non-permanent members: Bosnia–Herzegovina; Brazil; Colombia; Germany; Gabon; India; Lebanon; Nigeria; Portugal; South Africa

United Nations Security Council Resolution 2016 was unanimously adopted on 27 October 2011 on the situation of Libya during the Libyan Civil War.

Recognizing the "positive developments" in Libya after the Libyan Civil War and the death of Muammar Gaddafi, the resolution set a date of termination for the provisions of Security Council Resolution 1973. This allowed states to undertake "all necessary measures" to protect civilians and which formed the legal basis for military intervention by a number of foreign states. The termination date was set at 23:59, Libyan local time on 31 October 2011. The no-fly zone created with Resolution 1973 was also lifted on that date.

== Key Points ==
The resolution, adopted under Chapter VII of the United Nations Charter:

- strongly urges the Libyan authorities to refrain from reprisals, including arbitrary detentions,
- calls upon the Libyan authorities to take all steps necessary to prevent reprisals, wrongful imprisonment and extrajudicial executions,
- underscores the Libyan authorities’ responsibility for the protection of its population, including foreign nationals and African migrants;
- urges all Member States to cooperate closely with the Libyan authorities in their efforts to end impunity for violations of international human rights and international humanitarian law;
- terminates the provisions on paragraphs 4 and 5 ("Protection of Civilians") and the provisions of paragraphs 6 to 12 ("No-Fly Zone") of Resolution 1973 (2011) at 23.59 Libyan local time on 31 October 2011.

== Voting ==
Approved (15)	Abstained (0)	Opposed (0)
**United States**; **United Kingdom**; Gabon; Colombia; Nigeria; **France**; Bosnia and Herzegovina; Portugal; South Africa; Lebanon; India; **China**; Germany; Brazil; **Russia**		

* Permanent members of the Security Council are in bold.

== Observations ==
The Foreign Secretary of the United Kingdom, William Hague, called the resolution a "milestone towards a peaceful, democratic future for Libya". The United States ambassador to the United Nations, Susan Rice, said history would regard the intervention as "a proud chapter in the Security Council's experience". Russia's ambassador to the UN, Vitaly Churkin, said "we expect the NATO council to act in accordance with this decision".

== See also ==
- List of United Nations Security Council Resolutions 2001 to 2100
- United Nations Security Council Resolution 1973
- United Nations Security Council Resolution 1970
