= United Nations Security Council Resolution 1973 =

2011 resolution against Libya during the civil war

UN Security Council Resolution 1973
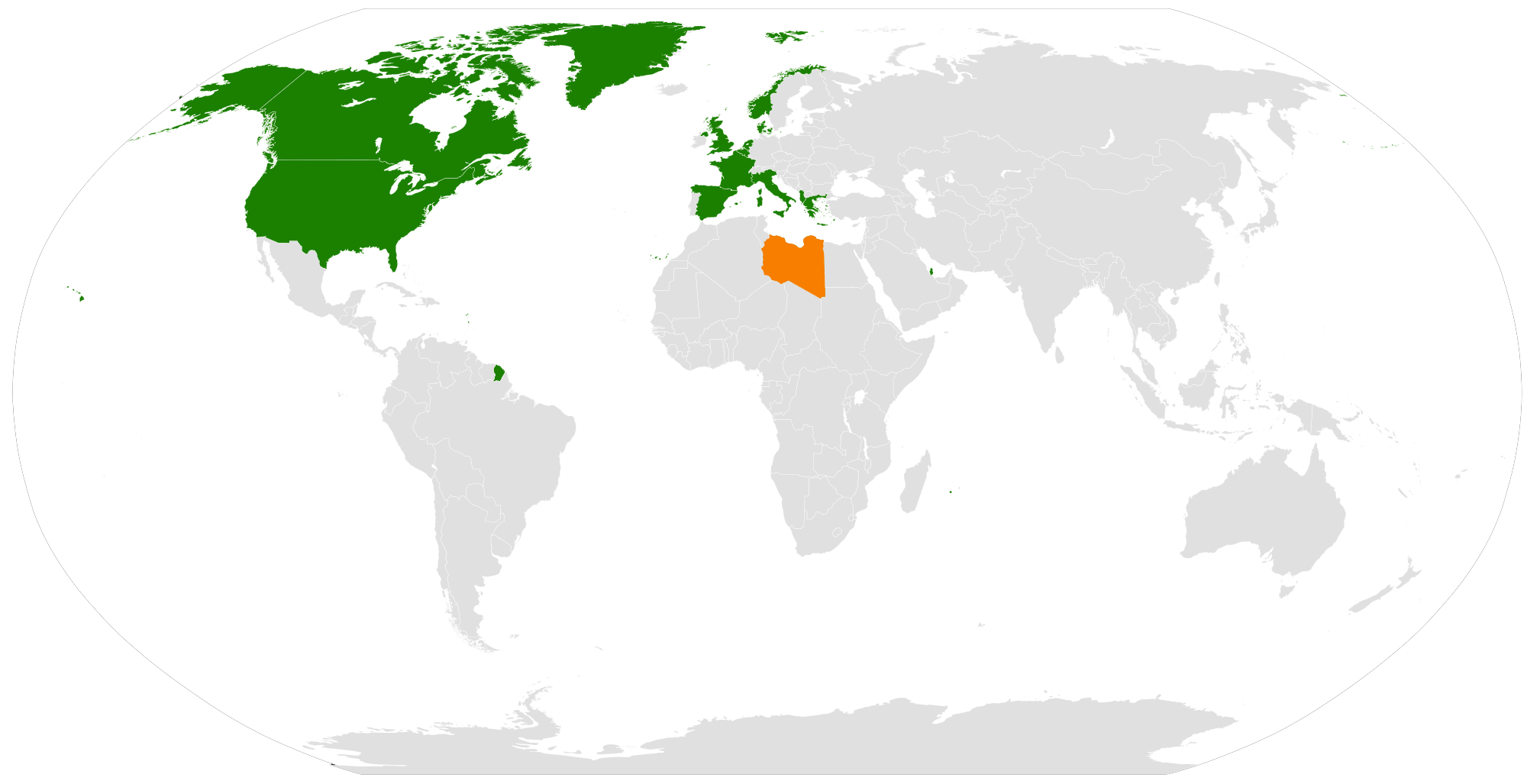
- States enforcing no-fly zone Libya
- Date: 17 March 2011
- Meeting no.: 6,498
- Code: S/RES/1973 (Document)
- Subject: Libyan Civil War
- Voting summary: 10 voted for; None voted against; 5 abstained
- Result: Adopted

Security Council composition
- Permanent members: China; France; Russia; United Kingdom; United States
- Non-permanent members: Bosnia–Herzegovina; Brazil; Colombia; Germany; Gabon; India; Lebanon; Nigeria; Portugal; South Africa

Resolution 1973 was adopted by the United Nations Security Council on 17 March 2011 in response to the First Libyan Civil War. The resolution formed the legal basis for military intervention in the Libyan Civil War, demanding "an immediate ceasefire" and authorizing the international community to establish a no-fly zone and to use all means necessary short of foreign occupation to protect civilians.

The Security Council resolution was proposed by France, Lebanon, and the United Kingdom. Ten Security Council members voted in the affirmative (Bosnia and Herzegovina, Colombia, Gabon, Lebanon, Nigeria, Portugal, South Africa, and permanent members France, the United Kingdom, and the United States). Five (Brazil, Germany, and India, and permanent members China and Russia) abstained, with none opposed.

== Resolution ==
=== Key points ===
The resolution, adopted under Chapter VII of the United Nations Charter:

- demands the immediate establishment of a ceasefire and a complete end to violence and all attacks against, and abuses of, civilians;
- imposes a no-fly zone over Libya;
- authorizes "all necessary measures [...] to protect civilians and civilian populated areas under threat of attack in the Libyan Arab Jamahiriya, including Benghazi, while excluding a foreign occupation force of any form on any part of Libyan territory";
- strengthens the arms embargo and particularly action against mercenaries, by allowing for forcible inspections of ships and planes;
- imposes a ban on all Libyan-designated flights;
- imposes an asset freeze on assets owned by the Libyan authorities, and reaffirms that such assets should be used for the benefit of the Libyan people;
- extends the travel ban and assets freeze of United Nations Security Council Resolution 1970 to a number of additional individuals and Libyan entities;
- establishes a panel of experts to monitor and promote sanctions implementation.

== Voting ==
| Approved (10) | Abstained (5) | Opposed (0) |
|---|---|---|
| Bosnia and Herzegovina; Colombia; **France**; Gabon; Lebanon; Nigeria; Portugal; South Africa; **United Kingdom**; **United States** | Brazil; **China**; Germany; India; **Russia** | |

* Permanent members of the Security Council are in bold.

Permanent members China and Russia had reservations about the no-fly zone, including the practicalities of enforcing such a zone and concerns about the use of force when other means had not been exhausted, but had noted requests by the Arab League and the "special situation" in Libya and therefore abstained. African members of the Security Council condemned the actions of the Libyan regime and supported the text.

The following day, Chancellor Angela Merkel said that Germany would not take part in the military operation, but added: "We unreservedly share the aims of this resolution. Our abstention should not be confused with neutrality." However, her foreign minister Guido Westerwelle had publicly stated his opposition to the resolution.

India abstained because it perceived the resolution as being based on uncertain information (lack of "credible information on the situation on the ground in Libya") and as being too open-ended (lacking "clarity about details of enforcement measures, including who and with what assets will participate and how these measures will be exactly carried out").

Brazil too abstained noting the fundamental contradiction in using force to achieve an "immediate end to violence and the protection of civilians". They believed that the use of force

may have the unintended effect of exacerbating tensions on the ground and causing more harm than good to the very same civilians we are committed to protecting.

The Brazilian Ambassador Mrs. Viotti further observed that

...an important aspect of the popular movement in North Africa and the Middle East is their spontaneous, homegrown nature. We are also concerned about the possibility that the use of military force, as called for in paragraph 4 of today's resolution, could change that narrative in ways that may have serious repercussions for the situation in Libya and beyond.

== Libyan response ==
Libyan opposition forces in Benghazi cheered and fired guns and fireworks into the air as the resolution was adopted. A few hours before issuing the resolution, Gaddafi warned the opposition with a speech saying, "We are coming tonight, and there will be no mercy".

On 18 March, Muammar Gaddafi's government announced that they would comply with the resolution and implement a ceasefire. However, it quickly became clear that no ceasefire had in fact been implemented.

=== Arming anti-Gaddafi forces ===
Before NATO's Intervention, Libya’s civil war was on the verge of ending, at the cost of 1,000 lives. The arms embargo imposed by paragraph 9 of resolution 1970 would have prevented arms being supplied to anyone in Libya. However, the resolution modified resolution 1970 with the wording "all necessary measures, notwithstanding paragraph 9 of resolution 1970" if doing so would protect civilians. Hillary Clinton argued that, though arming anti-Gaddafi forces was not being proposed at the time, it would be legal to do so.

== Implementation ==
US Air Force Lockheed EC-130J aircraft broadcasts a naval blockade warning message to Libyan ports during Operation Odyssey Dawn on 20 March 2011.

Military intervention in Libya began on 19 March, as fighter jets of the French Air Force destroyed several pro-Gaddafi vehicles advancing on rebel stronghold Benghazi. U.S. and British submarines then fired over 110 Tomahawk cruise missiles at targets throughout Libya, severely disabling the regime's air defense capability and allowing a wider enforcement of the no-fly zone to begin. A coalition of 10 states from Europe and the Middle East initially participated in the intervention, later expanding to 17. On 31 March, NATO assumed command of the operation. The intervention succeeded in preventing pro-Gaddafi forces from capturing Benghazi.

On 24 August, it was acknowledged for the first time that special forces troops from Britain, Italy, France, Jordan, Qatar, and the UAE had intervened on the ground in Libyan territory, stepping up operations in Tripoli and other cities. This has been questioned as a possible violation of Resolution 1973 although the use of special forces is not prohibited by the resolution.

== See also ==
- Foreign relations of Libya
- List of United Nations Security Council Resolutions 1901 to 2000 (2009–2011)
- Responsibility to protect
- United Nations Security Council Resolution 678
- United Nations Security Council Resolution 1970
- United Nations Security Council Resolution 2016
