= Early life and career of Muammar Gaddafi =

Life of Muammar Gaddafi from 1942–1966

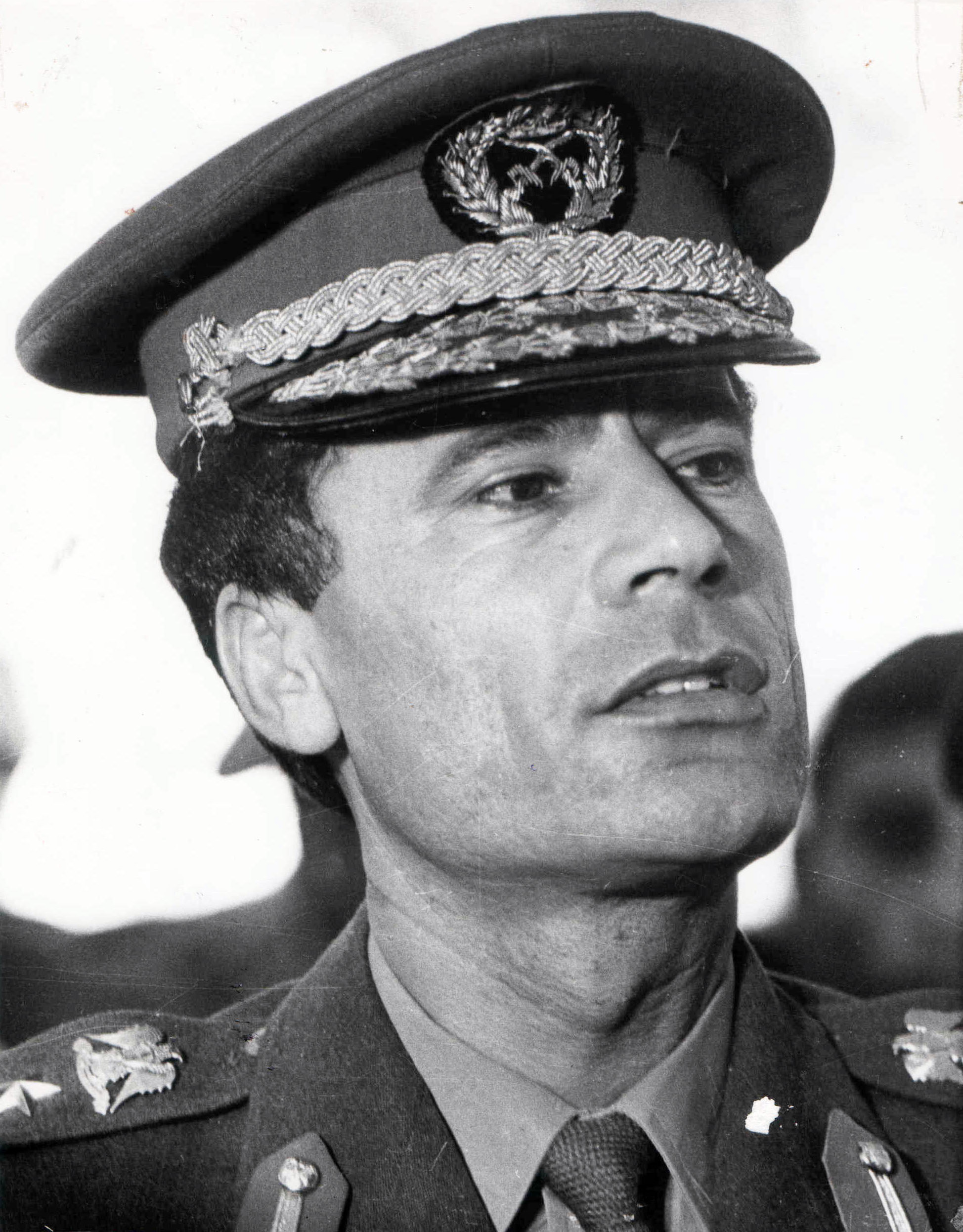
Subsequent photograph of Gaddafi, in 1971

Muammar Gaddafi was the ruler of Libya from 1969 to 2011. He was born in Qasr Abu Hadi, in a rural area in the deserts of Tripolitania. where he spent the early part of his childhood, living under European colonial powers. He then moved to the market town of Sabha, where he began to have pan-Arab beliefs and be active in politics. His life there would shape his world views. After graduating from high school, he joined the military college in Benghazi. At the military college, he struggled and was frequently in trouble for insubordination. It was then that he began plotting the overthrow of King Idris.

== Childhood: 1940s to 1950 ==
Muammar Mohammed Abu Minyar al-Gaddafi was born during the Italian occupation of Libya, in Qasr Abu Hadi, a rural area outside the town of Sirte, within the Sirte District, and located in the deserts of Tripolitania. His exact birthdate is not known, however some sources have set it in 1942 or in the spring of 1943. Biographers David Blundy and Andrew Lycett have noted that it could have been pre-1940.

Gaddaff's mother was Aisha bint Niran, and his father, Mohammad Abdul Salam bin Hamed bin Mohammad, also known as Abu Meniar, was a goat and camel herder. He was his parents' only surviving son to make it to adulthood and had three older sisters. His family was part of the Qadhadhfa, a relatively small Bedouin tribe. According to a declassified CIA Intelligence Memorandum, claims that the tribe were of Ashraf heritage, purportedly from the lineage of Musa al-Kazim are not accurate. The tribe descended from Sidi Qadhaf al-Dam, a historical holy man whose shrine is in Gharyan, Libya. Gaddafi's Bedouin upbringing influenced his personal tastes; he preferred the desert over the city and would retreat there to meditate.

In childhood, Gaddafi lived under European colonial powers. During the North African Campaign amidst the Second World War, he witnessed conflicts between Italian and British forces. Gaddafi's paternal grandfather, Abdessalam Bouminyar, was purportedly killed by the Italian Army during the Italian invasion of 1911. After the war, Libya was divided into two parts under British and French administration from 1943 until 1951, when the United Nations General Assembly granted Libya its independence. This led to the creation of the United Kingdom of Libya, a federal monarchy under the leadership of King Idris. The King was a pro-Western monarch, who banned political parties and centralized power into his own hands.

== Education and political activism: 1950–1963 ==
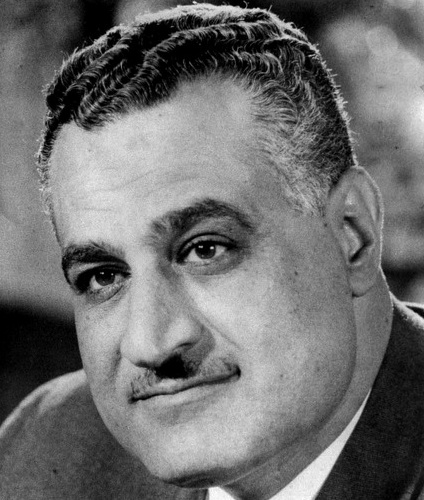
Egyptian President Gamal Abdel Nasser was Gaddafi's political hero.

At the age of seven, Gaddafi's education began at the home of a Quranic instructor under the traditional Kuttab system. At the age of nine he attended Sirte elementary school. He progressed through six grades in four years. There was no free education system in place for native Libyans, however his father thought it would greatly benefit his son despite the financial strain. Gaddafi slept in a mosque during the week. On weekends and holidays he walked 20 miles (32 km) to visit his parents. Gaddafi's father was not an educated man but he made great sacrifices to send his son to school. As an impoverished Bedouin, he faced bullying and discrimination from his city-dwelling classmates. It was there that Gaddafi developed a visceral feeling towards inequality.

After four years, he and his family moved to Sabha in Fezzan, south-central Libya, where his father worked as a caretaker for a tribal leader while Muammar attended secondary school. Many teachers at Sabha were Egyptian, and for the first time, Gaddafi had access to pan-Arab newspapers and radio broadcasts, notably the Cairo-based Voice of the Arabs. Gaddafi was popular at this school; some friends made there received significant jobs in his later administration, most notably his best friend, Abdul Salam Jalloud.

Growing up, Gaddafi witnessed significant events severely disturb the Arab world, including the 1948 Arab–Israeli War, the Egyptian Revolution of 1952, the Suez Crisis of 1956, and the short-lived existence of the United Arab Republic (UAR) between 1958 and 1961.

Gaddafi admired the political changes implemented in the Arab Republic of Egypt under his hero, President Gamal Abdel Nasser. Nasser argued for Arab nationalism; the rejection of Western colonialism, neo-colonialism, and Zionism; and a transition from capitalism to socialism. Gaddafi was influenced by Nasser's book, Philosophy of the Revolution, which outlined how to initiate a coup. One of Gaddafi's Egyptian teachers, Mahmoud Efay, was reportedly sympathetic towards the youth's political ideas, and advised him that a successful revolution would need the support of the army.

Gaddafi organized demonstrations and distributed posters criticizing the monarchy. In October 1961, he led a demonstration protesting against Syria's secession from the UAR and raised funds to send cables of support to Nasser. Twenty students were arrested as a result of the disorder. Gaddafi and his companions also broke windows in a local hotel that was accused of serving alcohol. To punish Gaddafi, the authorities expelled him from Sabha. Gaddafi moved to Misrata to attend Misrata Secondary School, graduating in 1963.

Maintaining his interest in Arab nationalist activism, he refused to join any of the banned political parties active in the city—including the Arab Nationalist Movement, the Arab Socialist Ba'ath Party, and the Muslim Brotherhood—claiming that he rejected factionalism. He read voraciously on the subjects of Nasser and the French Revolution of 1789, as well as the works of the Syrian political theorist Michel Aflaq and biographies of Abraham Lincoln, Sun Yat-sen, and Mustafa Kemal Atatürk.

== Military training: 1963–1966 ==
Gaddafi briefly studied history at the University of Libya in Benghazi before dropping out to join the military. Despite his police record, in 1963 he began training at the Royal Military Academy in Benghazi, alongside friends from Misrata. The military offered the only opportunity for upward social mobility for underprivileged Libyans, and Gaddafi recognized it as a potential instrument of political change.

Under Idris, Libya's armed forces were trained by the British; this angered Gaddafi, who viewed the British as imperialists, and accordingly refused to learn English and was rude to the British officers, ultimately failing his exams. British trainers reported him for insubordination and abusive behaviour, suspecting him of involvement in the assassination of the Benghazi Military Academy's Libyan commander in 1963. In fact, the head of the British military mission Colonel Ted Lough believed that Gaddafi was the one who pulled the trigger. The commander was shot near the academy and was rushed to the military hospital. Lough asked him who shot him and he responded "Muammar" and then died. Such reports were ignored, and Gaddafi managed to quickly progress through the course.

In 1964, Gaddafi formed the Central Committee of the Free Officers Movement, a group modeled on Nasser's Free Officers Movement. Led by Gaddafi, they met secretively and were organized into a clandestine cell system, pooling their salaries into a single fund. Gaddafi travelled around Libya collecting intelligence and developing connections with sympathizers, but government intelligence considered him little threat. Graduating from the academy in August 1965, Gaddafi became a communications officer in the army's signal corps.

In April 1966, Gaddafi was assigned to the United Kingdom for further training; over nine months he underwent an English-language course at Wilton Park in Beaconsfield, Buckinghamshire, an Army Air Corps signal instructors course in Bovington Camp, Dorset, and an infantry signal instructors course at Hythe, Kent.

Despite later rumours to the contrary, Gaddafi did not attend the Royal Military Academy Sandhurst. The Bovington signal course's director reported that Gaddafi successfully overcame problems learning English, displaying a firm command of voice procedure. Noting that Gaddafi's favourite hobbies were reading and playing football, the director thought of him as an "amusing officer, always cheerful, hard-working, and conscientious".

== Influence on later life ==
Gaddafi disliked England, claiming British Army officers had racially insulted him and finding it difficult adjusting to English culture; asserting his Arab identity in London, he walked around Piccadilly wearing traditional Libyan robes. While he travelled to England believing it more advanced than Libya, he returned home "more confident and proud of our values, ideals and social character". The racism that Gaddafi faced while undergoing military training in England would solidify his hatred for the West.

After overthrowing the king, Gaddafi would model his government after Nasser's, setting up a similar revolutionary council. Following Nasser's death in 1970, Gaddafi would become the self-proclaimed carrier of Nasser's legacy, calling for Arab and Muslim unity. His pan-Arabist thought would soon give way to anti-Western sentiment.

== Sources ==
- Bearman, Jonathan (1986). Qadhafi's Libya. London: Zed Books. ISBN 978-0-86232-434-6.
- Bianco, Mirella (1975). Gadafi: Voice from the Desert. Translated by Lyle, Margaret. London: Longman. ISBN 978-0-582-78062-0.
- Blundy, David; Lycett, Andrew (1987). Qaddafi and the Libyan Revolution. Boston: Little Brown & Co. ISBN 978-0-316-10042-7.
- Harris, Lillian Craig (1986). Libya: Qadhafi's Revolution and the Modern State. Boulder, Colorado: Westview Press. ISBN 978-0-8133-0075-7.
- Kawczynski, Daniel (2011). Seeking Gaddafi: Libya, the West and the Arab Spring. London: Biteback. ISBN 978-1-84954-148-0.
- Krasno, Jean; LaPides, Sean (2015-07-07). Personality, Political Leadership, and Decision Making: A Global Perspective. Bloomsbury Publishing USA. ISBN 978-1-4408-3911-5.
- Simons, Geoff (1996). Libya: The Struggle for Survival (second ed.). Houndmills and London: Macmillan Publishers. ISBN 978-0-23038-011-0.
- St. John, Ronald Bruce (2012). Libya: From Colony to Revolution (rev. ed.). Oxford: Oneworld Publications. ISBN 978-1-85168-919-4.
- Vandewalle, Dirk (2008). "Libya's Revolution in Perspective 1969–2000". In Vandewalle, Dirk (ed.). Libya Since 1969: Qadhafi's Revolution Revisited. Basingstoke, England: Palgrave Macmillan. pp. 9–53. doi:10.1007/978-0-230-61386-7_2. ISBN 978-0-230-33750-3.
