= Battle of Sirte =

Battle of Sirte may refer to military events, either in the Gulf of Sidra or in the Libyan city of Sirte located on its shore.

- during the Battle of the Mediterranean of World War II:
  - First Battle of Sirte, fought on 17 December 1941
  - Second Battle of Sirte, fought on 22 March 1942
- as part of Libya–United States relations during Cold War
  - Gulf of Sidra incident (1981)
- during the Libyan Civil War of 2011 (fall of Muammar Gaddafi)
  - Second Gulf of Sidra offensive, fought from 22 August to 20 October 2011 during the Libyan civil war
  - Battle of Sirte (2011), fought from 15 September to 20 October 2011 during the Libyan civil war
- during the Libyan civil war of 2014 to 2020
  - Battle of Sirte (2015), fall of Sirte to ISIL
  - Battle of Sirte (2016), Government of National Accord effort to liberate Sirte from ISIL
  - Battle of Sirte (2020), the Libyan National Army captured Sirte from the Government of National Accord
