= Second Gulf of Sidra offensive =

Military opperation in the First Libyan Civil War

Coordinates: 31°30′N 18°0′E

- Part of First Libyan Civil War
Date	22 August – 20 October 2011
Location	Libyan Coastal Highway
Result	Anti-Gaddafi Victory: Anti-Gaddafi forces capture Ra's Lanuf, Bin Jawad and Nofaliya in late August; Anti-Gaddafi forces start a full-scale attack on Sirte on 15 September, but are repulsed three times by 29 September; New opposition attack on Sirte in October that leads to the capture of the city by anti-Gaddafi forces on 20 October; Muammar Gaddafi, Mutassim Gaddafi, and Abu-Bakr Yunis Jabr killed; End of First Libyan Civil War

Belligerents
(Libya) National Transitional Council: Free Libyan Military; NATO command	(Libya) Gaddafi loyalists: Remnants of the Libyan Army; Paramilitary Forces

Commanders and leaders
(Libya) Col. Hamid Hassy (Libya) Mustafa Bin Dardef †	(Libya) Muammar Gaddafi (executed) (Libya) Mutassim Gaddafi X (Libya) Abu-Bakr Yunis Jabr X (Libya) Mansour Dhao (POW) (Libya) Abdel Rahman Abdel Hamid (POW)

Strength
16,000 fighters 163–900 technicals	1,000–5,000 fighters

Casualties and losses
437 killed	236-903 killed*
- 800 civilians killed (NTC claim); 2,151 civilians killed (Loyalist claim)
- Based largely on unconfirmed rebel and civilian claims

The Second Gulf of Sidra offensive was a military operation in the First Libyan Civil War conducted by rebel anti-Gaddafi forces in August and September 2011 to take control of towns along the Gulf of Sidra in an effort to surround Muammar Gaddafi's hometown of Sirte, which was held by pro-Gaddafi forces. The offensive ended on 20 October, with the capture and execution of Muammar Gaddafi and his son Mutassim Gaddafi, along with former defense minister Abu-Bakr Yunis Jabr. The Gaddafi loyalists in the area were finally defeated when NTC fighters captured Sirte.

== Background ==
Following the success of rebels hostile to the Gaddafi government in Tripoli, rebels in Brega claimed that they had made advances, taking over the entirety of the oil-port town of Brega including its residential and port areas. They then planned to advance westwards.

== Rebel offensive ==
22 August

A spokesman for the National Liberation Army said on 22 August that Gaddafi's forces had finally retreated westward to Sirte and all of Brega was under the opposition's control. This was later denied by Ahmed Omar Bani, the rebels' military spokesman, who said the eastern "front is still at Brega". Loyalists near Sirte fired a scud missile at Misrata.

23 August

A day later, it was confirmed that rebel forces had managed to capture the village of El Agheila and were on their way to Ra's Lanuf. Ra's Lanuf fell to the opposition soon after and they were on the outskirts of the small town of Bin Jawad, 150 km east of Gaddafi's home town of Sirte.

It was also reported by Reuters that the rebels were negotiating with Sirte leaders to enter the city without bloodshed.

The rebels managed to advance to the outskirts of the small coastal town of Bin Jawad, resulting in the Second Battle of Bin Jawad, but were unable to progress further due to heavy loyalist resistance in the area.

More scud missile were fired at Misrata, all reportedly either falling into the sea or causing no damage upon landing

24 August

On 24 August, a heavy loyalist artillery bombardment caused the rebels to retreat 20 km from Bin Jawad to Sidra. During the fighting, loyalists ambushed the advancing rebels once again at Bin Jawad, in an echo of an earlier defeat in March. Twenty rebel fighters died in the clashes.

25 August

RAF Tornado aircraft attacked a military bunker in Sirte with precision guided missiles, in an attempt to destroy the government's remaining command and control capabilities, ahead of the rebels planned offensive on the city. NATO aircraft also destroyed 29 armoured vehicles which were moving to Misrata. The rebels, for their part, retreated further to Ra's Lanuf to put themselves out of range of rockets fired by pro-Gaddafi forces.

27 August

Rebels claimed sending a brigade to negotiate the surrender of Sirte. Al Jazeera English reported that there were negotiations between rebels and loyalists in Ra's Lanuf. Later that day, rebel forces were able to recapture Bin Jawad and move closer to Sirte.

28 August

NLA forces advanced on two fronts towards the town of Nofaliya, which was captured later that day.

30 August

The National Transitional Council gave the loyalists in Sirte a four-day-ultimatum to surrender or to face military assault.

1 September

The ultimatum was extended for another week by the NTC. A spokesman stated that Sirte had no economic importance and that the rebels would not risk casualties for it. Meanwhile, negotiations between tribal leaders from Nofaliya and the Bin Jawad area (on NTC behalf) and from Sirte were still ongoing. The NLA forces claimed that Harawa, a village 50 km east of Sirte, had surrendered. NATO bombardment of the area continued unabated, independent of the NTC ultimatums.

4 September

A NLA commander claimed that the village of Umm El Ghindel agreed to lay down their weapons. Reuters reported that the NLA raised their flag on the entry of the village.

6 September

NLA forces advanced 8 km towards Sirte, meeting heavy resistance from loyalist forces. One NLA fighter died in the fighting and at least one loyalist was killed and another wounded. Both sides engaged in artillery duels during the day and three loyalist vehicles were bombed by NATO and two others captured by the NLA. According to frontline commanders, the clashes occurred when a recon patrol was attacked by loyalists and that the attack on Sirte had yet to begin. Also, to the west of Sirte, NTC forces overran a tribal encampment without resistance, taking over 100 assault rifles and some machineguns.

8 September

An NLA commander claimed that the Red Valley, east of Sirte, was captured by NLA forces. Eight rebels and three loyalists were killed during the fighting in the valley and one pro-Gaddafi fighter was captured.

9 September

Opposition forces engaged loyalist troops near Sirte, in the Red Valley, during the night but withdrew after suffering heavy casualties.

10–14 September

During a period of heavy fighting, in which opposition forces attempted to advance toward Sirte but made only gains of a few kilometers, at least 80 rebel fighters were killed. According to the Misrata Military Council, the living conditions inside Sirte were worsening. The city suffered from a lack of water and food.

15-18 September

On 15 September, NLA forces based out of Misrata moved into Sirte from the west. Opposition troops initially made some gains by capturing the airport south of the city and penetrating the city limits. But by 18 September, the rebels had retreated to the city's outskirts after encountering stiff resistance from well-armed loyalists and suffering heavy casualties.

At the same time, eastern NLA forces captured the village of Harawa in an attempt to support forces from the west which were already engaged in a battle for Sirte itself.

20 September

On 20 September, Al Jazeera reported that eastern NLA forces finally reached the eastern gates of Sirte and thus put Sirte under effective siege from all sides. However, later reports put opposition forces at the town of Khamseen, still another 50 kilometers east of Sirte, facing stiff resistance from loyalist troops.

24 September

On 24 September, NTC forces made another attempt at storming Sirte and captured a few neighbourhoods in the western part of the city. But by the next morning, they again retreated from the western part of Sirte, after meeting strong resistance from loyalist forces. To the east, NLA troops advanced to within 20 kilometers of Sirte.

26 September

Opposition forces continued their offensive against Sirte with NTC tanks shelling the city center from a distance of 2 kilometers from the western outskirts. Meanwhile, the main opposition eastern assault body fought their way to 10 kilometers of the town.

== NATO strikes ==
20 August-20 September NATO Strikes
Date	Vehicles	Tanks	Missiles and Missile Launchers	Buildings	Radar and Antennas
20 August	0	0	0	1 Command and Control Node	0
24 August	0	0	1 Surface to Surface Missile Support Vehicle	0	0
25 August	29 Armed Vehicles	0	0	1 Command and Control Node	0
26 August	11 Armed Vehicles, 3 Logistic Military Vehicles, 1 Armoured Fighting Vehicle	0	0	1 Military Observation Point, 2 Military Shelters, 1 Military Engineer Asset	0
27 August	1 Armoured Fighting Vehicle	0	1 Surface to Surface Supply Vehicle	0	0
28 August	3 Military Support Vehicles	0	20 Surface to Air Missile Canisters, 2 Surface to Air Missile Systems	0	4 Radar Systems, 1 Antenna
29 August	22 Armed Vehicles, 2 Military Support Vehicles	0	2 Surface to Air Missile Systems	3 Command and Control Nodes, 1 Command Post, 1 Military Facility	4 Radar Systems
30 August	12 Armed Vehicles	3	0	1 Command and Control Facility, 1 Military Facility, 1 Command Post	1 Radar System
31 August	1 Armed Vehicle	1	5 Surface to Air Missile Transloaders, 4 Surface to Air Missile Launchers, 1 Multiple Rocket Launcher	1 Command and Control Node	0
1 September	2 Armed Vehicles, 2 Military Trucks	1	7 Surface-to-Air Missile Launchers, 3 Surface-to-Air Missile Launchers	1 Command and Control Node/Ammo Storage Facility	0
2 September	0	3	11 Surface to Air Missile Canisters	1 Ammo Storage Facility, 1 Training Area	0
3 September	1 Self-propelled Artillery Piece	0	7 Surface-to-Air Missile Canisters, 1 Surface-to-Air Missile System	1 Military Barracks, 1 Ammunition Storage Facility, 1 Military Police Camp, 1 Command and Control Node	0
4 September	2 Armed Vehicles	0	4 Multiple Rocket Launchers, 4 Surface to Air Missile Canisters	1 Military Vehicle Storage Facility, 2 Heavy Machine Guns	0
5 September	4 Armed Vehicles	0	4 Surface to Air Missile Systems	1 Military Radar/Communication Site, 1 Command and Control Bunker, 2 Military Settlements	0
6 September	4 Armed Vehicles, 6 Armoured Fighting Vehicles, 1 Self-propelled Artillery	6	1 Surface to Air Missile Canister, 1 Multiple Rocket Launcher	1 Ammo Storage Facility	0
7 September	5 Armoured Fighting Vehicles, 2 Armed Vehicles	0	0	0	0
8 September	2 Armed Vehicles	0	1 Multiple Rocket Launcher	0	0
9 September	1 Armed Vehicle	0	1 Multiple Rocket Launcher	1 Surface to Surface Missile Facility	0
10 September	2 Armed Vehicles	2	1 Surface to Air Missile Canister	0	0
11 September	7 Armed Vehicles	0	3 Surface to Air Missile Systems	1 Military Logistic Facility, 1 Command and Control Node	1 Radar System
12 September	1 Armed Vehicle, 2 Air Defense Command Vehicles	0	8 Surface to Air Missile Systems, 5 Surface to Air Missile Trailers/Transloaders	0	1 Radar System
13 September	1 Armed Vehicle, 2 Anti-Aircraft Guns	0	1 Multiple Rocket Launcher	1 Command and Control Node	4 Radar Systems
14 September	0	0	2 Surface to Air Missile Systems	1 Command and Control Node, 1 Military Vehicle Storage Facility	4 Radar Systems
15 September	2 Armed Vehicles	1	4 Multiple Rocket Launchers, 8 Air Missile Systems	1 Military Storage Facility	0
16 September	4 Armed Vehicles	0	8 Air Missile Systems	5 Command and Control Nodes	3 Radar Systems
17 September	1 Armed Vehicle	0	4 Multiple Rocket Launchers, 4 Surface to Air Missile Systems	2 Command and Control Nodes	0
18 September	0	0	4 Surface to Air Missile Systems, 1 Multiple Rocket Launcher	1 Military Facility, 1 Command and Control Node	0
19 September	1 Armed Vehicle	0	1 Multiple Rocket System	0	0
20 September	0	1	6 Air Missile Systems	1 Military Vehicle Storage Facility, 2 Military Ammunition/Storage Facilities, 1 Command and Control Node	0
Total	140	18	140	50	23
