= Battle of Sirte (2011) =

Final battle of the First Libyan Civil War

Coordinates: 31°12′19″N 16°35′20″E

- Part of the Second Gulf of Sidra offensive of the First Libyan Civil War
- Situation in Sirte just prior to the 20 October assault
Date	15 September – 20 October 2011 (1 month and 5 days)
Location	Sirte, Libya
Result	Decisive National Transitional Council victory: Pro-Gaddafi forces repel three rebel attacks on the city in September; Anti-Gaddafi forces capture all of Sirte after a fourth attack; Fall of the last Gaddafi loyalist pockets; Muammar Gaddafi, Mutassim Gaddafi, and Abu-Bakr Yunis Jabr killed

Belligerents
Libya: National Liberation Army; NATO command	(Libya) Gaddafi loyalists: Remnants of the Libyan Army; Paramilitary forces

Commanders and leaders
(Libya) Hamid Hassy (Libya) Mustafa Bin Dardef † (Libya) Touhami Zayani (Libya) Essam Baghhar (Libya) Yunus al-Abdali	(Libya) Muammar Gaddafi (WIA) (executed) (Libya) Mutassim Gaddafi (WIA) X (Libya) Abu-Bakr Yunis Jabr X (Libya) Musbah Ahmed Dyab † (Libya) Mansour Dhao (POW) (Libya) Abdel Rahman Abdel Hamid (POW) (Libya) Sayyid Gaddaf al-Dam (POW)

Units involved
Unknown	People's Guard

Strength
16,000 fighters 163–900 technicals	1,000–5,000 fighters (NTC claim)

Casualties and losses
265 killed, 2,030 wounded	868 killed, 200 wounded, 150+ captured
- 800 civilians killed (NTC claim); 2,151 civilians killed (Loyalist claim)

The Battle of Sirte was the final and most decisive battle of the First Libyan Civil War, beginning when the National Liberation Army attacked the last remnants of the Libyan army still loyal to Muammar Gaddafi in his hometown and designated capital of Sirte, on the Gulf of Sidra. As of September 2011, Sirte and Bani Walid were the last strongholds of Gaddafi loyalists and the National Transitional Council hoped that the fall of Sirte would bring the war to an end. The battle and its aftermath marked the fall of the final stronghold of Gaddafi loyalists. Both Gaddafi and his son, Mutassim, were wounded and captured, then tortured and killed in custody less than an hour later. The month-long battle left Sirte almost completely in ruins, with many buildings damaged or totally destroyed.

== Background ==
In August 2011, anti-Gaddafi forces began a three-pronged advance toward Sirte which lasted several weeks. Pushing forward from Misrata in the west, Brega in the east, and desert positions in the south, they met fierce resistance and suffered heavy casualties in their efforts to reach the city.

== Battle ==
=== First opposition attack repelled ===
15–18 September

On 15 September, a spokesman for the National Transitional Council claimed that after being bogged down about 50 km from Sirte for the past several days, opposition fighters had made a major push and reached the western outskirts of Sirte. NTC forces reached the Gharbiyat Bridge on the southwestern edge of the city, and encountered resistance from Gaddafi loyalists. That evening, an NTC military spokesman told Reuters that NTC forces had entered the city itself and that heavy fighting had erupted. A few hours later, the Misrata military council announced that their fighters had taken control of the city center and the exit road, and were cleaning out pockets of resistance, particularly along the beachfront, where remnants of the Khamis Brigade were believed to be holding out. A short time later, however, a spokesman for the opposition forces stated that they were 8–10 kilometers from the city center, having withdrawn to treat casualties.

On 16 September, Al Jazeera claimed that Sirte's airport, 10 kilometers south of the city, was under NTC control. It was also confirmed that opposition forces had been compelled to retreat from the city itself the previous night, after entering it briefly, due to heavy resistance. On 16 September NTC forces launched a larger offensive into the city, and heavy fighting ensued on Sirte's main boulevard, 1 September St.

According to a man claiming to be a spokesman for opposition fighters from inside Sirte, local opposition forces already controlled much of the city, and had been under siege by pro-Gaddafi forces for several months. The man's identity and his claims could not be independently confirmed.

By the evening of the 16th, opposition forces again pulled back from the city after a day of fierce, chaotic street fighting, seemingly contradicting the earlier report by the claimed opposition spokesman from Sirte. The support the opposition had expected from Sirte's residents had not materialized, and loyalist forces had put up stronger resistance than anticipated.

On 17 September anti-Gaddafi fighters renewed their offensive. Sirte's interim representative in the NTC said he had information that "there is no full control over Sirte" by either side, with parts of the city remaining under loyalist control and other parts being taken by opposition fighters. At least three anti-Gaddafi fighters were killed in the fighting, and many wounded were evacuated to a field hospital set up at a gas station on the outskirts of Sirte.

On the eastern front, Al Jazeera reported anti-Gaddafi forces were still struggling to advance. A correspondent in Ras Lanuf said many villages that anti-Gaddafi fighters had entered were found to be deserted, suggesting that their inhabitants had been persuaded to flee by pro-Gaddafi elements.

Later, opposition forces stated that they had captured the city's airport, which they had already claimed to have done one day earlier. An opposition fighter, who was returning from the frontline, stated that NTC forces did not control even 5% of the city, and contradicted his officers' claims of the airport takeover by saying that the NTC forces were only able to enter enemy territory by day and had to pull back at night. Later, it was confirmed that the airport was still in loyalist hands.

On 18 September opposition forces made another incursion into Sirte, but by dusk, had once again retreated to the city's outskirts.

=== Eastern rebel forces approach ===
19–23 September

On 22 September, opposition forces advancing from the east, including units from Benghazi, Bayda, and Derna, halted their advance on Sirte for a week due to a shortage of ammunition. Meanwhile, commanders on the front line west of the town said they had been told to expect further NATO air strikes on Thursday and had orders not to advance.

On the evening of 23 September, NTC fighters managed to reach the city's eastern gate with virtually no resistance from pro-Gaddafi forces.

=== Second opposition attack repelled ===
24–25 September

On 24 September, after a week of preparations, NTC forces swarmed into the city from the west, taking control of Zafran Square, about one mile from the city center. Opposition troops advanced to a major TV broadcasting station in the city's western part, and encountered heavy resistance from loyalist troops on the main boulevard, toward the city center. An NTC military spokesman claimed that they expected to capture two western neighborhoods by evening. A BBC News correspondent reported that anti-Gaddafi fighters had made a particularly swift advance from the east as well, pushing deep into Sirte, and judged the battle to be tipping in favour of the interim government's forces.

On 25 September, after continued strong resistance from loyalist forces, the NTC fighters retreated from the western part of Sirte, returning to the outskirts. Nine opposition fighters had been killed and 97 wounded in the previous day of fighting.

=== Third opposition attack repelled ===
26–28 September

On 26 September NTC forces continued their offensive against Sirte, with NTC tanks on the western outskirts shelling the city center from a distance of two kilometers. Dr. Eman Mohammed, a civilian doctor who worked at the city's central Ibn Sina Hospital before fleeing the fighting to NTC-held territory, reported that most civilian deaths and injuries appeared to have been caused by NTC shelling, leading vengeful relatives to join the pro-Gaddafi forces as armed volunteers. Meanwhile, the main NTC eastern assault body fought their way to within 10 kilometers of the town, and then entered the city itself a few hours later.

On 27 September, an NTC senior military commander in Tripoli announced that their forces had managed to secure the port and were battling for control of the city center, where snipers were halting their progress. Opposition troops advancing from the west were still in the city's outskirts, while those advancing from the east were pinned down by snipers at a roundabout approximately 2 kilometers from the city center, at the eastern edge of the town. Later in the day a shaken NTC fighter from the roundabout arrived at opposition lines outside the city, requesting immediate reinforcement for those left behind. The NTC forces that managed to get to the roundabout could not move due to heavy sniper activity, and were constantly hit with accurate artillery and rocket fire, sustaining heavy casualties. A larger body of reinforcements was held back by a heavy artillery barrage between them and the cut-off troops. Heavy face-to-face fighting was also raging at the Mahari hotel.

On 28 September the NTC offensive continued, with the western and eastern opposition forces attempting to link up south of the city by capturing the airport, which they had already claimed to have seized on several occasions. On the eastern side, however, there were almost no advances. NTC fighters were still pinned down, for a third day, at the roundabout, and not even the arrival of five tanks managed to break the stalemate, as they quickly came under accurate loyalist rocket fire, missing them by only a few yards.

Later in the evening, opposition forces on the eastern edge of the city were finally pushed three kilometers outside the city after a series of ferocious attacks by loyalist fighters.

=== NTC forces link up, cease-fire ===
29 September – 3 October

On the morning of 29 September NTC forces pushing from both west and east once again captured the city's airport, but were still facing rocket fire from the other side of the runway.

On 30 September there was no major activity on the frontline, except constant shelling. For a fifth straight day the NTC force at the roundabout remained pinned down, having temporarily run out of ammunition the day before. At this time, a two-day cease-fire was declared by the NTC to give civilians a chance to flee the city, and to allow Red Cross officials to inspect a hospital close to the city center.

On 1 October, a force of about 100 NTC vehicles entered the city from the south and encircled the Ouagadougou Conference Center. Despite the declared cease-fire, NTC shelling of the city center continued near the hospital (west of the conference center) which the humanitarian workers were visiting.

On 2 October, an NTC source claimed that they had taken 95 percent of the town of Qasr Abu Hadi, just opposite of the airport south of the city, which was home to many pro-Gaddafi loyalists and also a small military base. It was also the birthplace of Muammar Gaddafi himself. Another opposition source, however, stated that they were concentrating on the town and still targeting it, having learned from a captured loyalist that Mutassim Gaddafi was possibly holed up in that area. Red Cross officials who had pulled back from the hospital near the city center described a dire situation, with patients dying from the lack of medical supplies and power shortages. They and fleeing civilians also stated that civilian areas were being hit by indiscriminate fire from loyalist, opposition, and NATO forces. That evening NTC forces pulled out of the town of Gaddafi's birth, claiming they had been ordered out so that NATO could conduct air-strikes in the area. Later, it was reported that at this time Mutassim Gaddafi managed to slip out of Sirte and headed south into the Libyan desert.

On the morning of 3 October, Reuters reported that NTC forces had taken control of Qasr Abu Hadi and were clearing out pockets of resistance. However, a NTC commander said they had taken control of 75 percent of the town. Al Jazeera disputed an advance on Qasr Abu Hadi altogether, stating opposition troops were holding positions three kilometers from the town. The BBC confirmed that a new assault on Sirte had started, but noted that the offensive seemed un-coordinated, and that opposition rocket and artillery fire directed at the city appeared random, potentially endangering civilians. Later that evening, Gaddafi's hometown was declared secured by the opposition forces.

=== Fourth opposition attack ===
4–12 October

On 4 October opposition forces advanced on the conference centre in Sirte, which was being used as a base by the loyalists. Soon, heavy and accurate pro-Gaddafi fire hit the NTC column, sending it into retreat.

On 5 October, NTC forces claimed to have made a push into the center of Sirte, while their commander announced that they had taken control of half of the city and were expecting it to fall within two days. Both claims would soon be proven untrue. According to NTC forces, the only people left in the city were mercenaries, pro-Gaddafi die-hard fighters, and perhaps Mutassim Gaddafi, while several local citizens said there were almost no loyalist troops left in the city, and resistance was coming mostly from civilian volunteers who were afraid of being massacred by NTC forces. During the assault, for the first time in the war, a loyalist suicide bomber blew himself up among opposition fighters, killing and wounding several.

In Abu Hadi, NTC fighters from Misrata began looting and burning houses in vengeance for the Battle of Misrata. Calls by eastern NTC troops for an end to the looting were ignored. According to humanitarian workers, the NATO bombing was sometimes doing the opposite of its declared purpose of protecting civilians. One aid worker said there was "a lot of indiscriminate fire", and that he had spoken to residents and doctors who complained about deaths from NATO air strikes.

On 6 October, the opposition push into Sirte had once again stalled, with loyalist snipers blocking their advance. The only solid gain the NTC had made in the previous 24 hours was the taking of a luxury hotel on the northeastern edge of the city. During the night, loyalists advanced several hundred meters under the cover of darkness and took up positions closer to the NTC frontline. Heavy fighting raged during the day on the road leading from the hotel. NTC fighters attempted to advance along the seafront and cut off the Mauritanian Quarter, where a large number of loyalists were holed up. Also, an NTC force was holding positions on open ground about 1.5 kilometers south of the conference center and bombarding loyalist forces, who were replying with mortar fire. On the eastern side of Sirte, loyalists attacked opposition fighters at the roundabout during the day with an anti-aircraft gun. By evening, the NTC fighters at the conference center, though supported by three tanks, were driven back by loyalist missile fire.

On 7 October NTC forces launched a coordinated attack from three sides, dubbed the "final assaut", attacking the Ouagadougou conference center, the Mauritanian Quarter, and the city's university. By early evening, 15 NTC fighters were dead and 193 wounded. Among the dead was Colonel Amin El Turki, one of the western front commanders, and among the wounded was Ali Saeh, a senior commander of the Free Libya Brigade, who was shot twice by a sniper while leading his fighters through a residential area. Most of the casualties occurred when opposition forces attempted to advance across an open field toward Ouagadougou, and were repelled under heavy fire. By this time, reports put opposition units 1–2 kilometers from the city center, but still unable to overcome the large loyalist hold-outs, such as the conference center, where they managed to get to the center's perimeter wall but could not advance further.

At the end of the day, a BBC correspondent on the ground claimed that NTC forces had taken control of most of Sirte, an NTC military commander claimed they controlled over three quarters of the city, and an unnamed US government source stated 80 percent. However, heavy fighting at the conference hall, the city center, the university building, Gaddafi's palace, and the Mauritanian Quarter continued well into the night. By the next morning, it was clear that claims of opposition success the previous day were premature, and that loyalists were still in control of most of the city.

On 8 October, fighting at the Ouagadougou conference center continued. NTC fighters with 100 vehicles pushed into the southern part of the city, only to retreat after encountering heavy resistance. Meanwhile, eastern front troops were fighting in the Giza (Mauritanian) district, and western units were advancing towards Green square in the heart of Sirte. The previous night, under the cover of darkness and a sandstorm, loyalists had regained some ground on the northeastern edge of the city, forcing NTC fighters to pull back. Some 500 meters of no-man's land divided the loyalists and the opposition fighters who were stationed at the hotel. Snipers used trenches between buildings to change their positions, making it almost impossible for NTC spotters to determine their exact locations. Later in the day NTC forces took control of the Sabamaiyah residential area (or Seven Hundred complex), three kilometers inside the city, which was home to many pro-Gaddafi officers and commanders in the Army. Western troops had also taken control of the strategic dual-lane avenue leading from the city center to the south, effectively cutting off the Ouagadougou complex from the rest of the city. An NTC commander on the ground claimed that pro-Gaddafi troops had been driven away from Ibn Sina hospital, which was later found to be untrue. Fighting continued at Gaddafi's palace and the university. An NTC tank, driven by a lone operator, suicidally charged across an open field toward the university area in an attempt to breach the reinforced walls around it, which were still standing after 36 hours of constant rocket barrages. It is not known what happened to the tank and the driver after it disappeared into the smoke of the front lines. In the words of a BBC journalist, "Pro-Gaddafi forces are putting up extraordinary resistance in defence of what seems a lost cause". The loyalists were reported to still have several tanks, heavy artillery pieces, and rocket launchers.

During the previous two days of combat the NTC had lost 32 fighters, and a further 326 had been wounded. Overall, the NTC offensive had been a costly and very limited success, with only the Sabamiyah neighborhood (also known as the Seven Hundred complex) captured on the second day.

On the night of 8–9 October the opposition was able to secure Sirte university; however, they lost 10 fighters and had more than 100 injured. The opposition had still not captured the Ibn Sina hospital because, per a NTC commander, they wanted to prevent civilian casualties which would result from fighting in its proximity. During the morning, after spending the night on the campus grounds, the NTC fighters came under random strikes, sustaining several casualties. Due to the firing they had trouble evacuating the dead and wounded from the university. Later that day NTC forces once again entered Ouagadougou center, and finally took control of it. In the late afternoon NTC forces were able to secure Ibn Sina hospital, and started with the evacuation of the wounded and sick. At one point, NTC forces attempted to advance into the western residential districts but a loyalist mortar barrage hit the opposition column, inflicting heavy losses on them with dozens of dead and wounded arriving at a field hospital and sending the opposition fighters into a frantic retreat. At least 10 NTC technicals were destroyed. Also, NTC troops had been battling east of Green Square and announced that they had taken control over Al Giza district.

By the end of 9 October, Gaddafi's palace, the western residential areas and the city center were the last loyalist-held parts of the city. During the night, loyalists launched a strong counter-attack in the east of the city, leaving 17 opposition fighters dead and 87 wounded. Counter-attacking loyalists also hit anti-Gaddafi forces at Ibn Sina, forcing them to retreat from positions around the hospital. At the same time, the NTC fighters near the city center were attacking the Gaddafi security headquarters, pounding the building with anti-aircraft fire and rockets. The opposition stated that they had captured a nephew of Muammar Gaddafi's, Abdel Rahman Abdel Hamid, during the day. He had been a commander of one of the loyalist brigades in Sirte. The NTC had claimed that he had been executed by other loyalists two weeks previously.

On 10 October, fighting was still raging near the hospital. Opposition fighters attempted to advance from the conference center, but were pinned down about 400 yards from the residential areas they were trying to enter. Back-and-forth fighting also occurred at the television and radio station. NTC forces managed to capture it from the loyalists, but pro-Gaddafi forces soon retook the station, and later repelled a new opposition assault against the building.

On 11 October, an advance force of 30 opposition fighters captured the police headquarters near the city center, having found the building empty while scouting enemy positions. Soon after, a new round of fighting erupted in the southwestern part of the city. Later, NTC forces punched through the central line of defence in Sirte. Facing little resistance and losing no men in the assault, they pushed pro-Gaddafi forces into two neighborhoods (Al Shabiyah and Al Dollar). Also on the 11th, the southern, western and eastern fronts linked up a few hundred meters from the city center.

On 12 October, NTC forces pushed even further, reducing loyalist-held territory to the Al Dollar neighborhood and districts 1 and 2. Fighting continued in the city center and at the TV station. Hundreds of civilians, mostly women and children, were streaming out of the contested areas during lulls in the fighting, leaving behind a city in ruins. The loyalists flooded large parts of the streets of District 2 by bursting sewage pipes. This slowed opposition fighters, who were at times advancing in thigh-deep water. One NTC tank maneuvered into a small side street flooded with sewage from one of the burst pipes. It fired several rounds toward a large building where suspected loyalists were holed up. Infantry then moved down the street firing their weapons. They initially received little return fire, but as they moved closer to the building they were ambushed and forced to pull back under a hail of RPG and small-arms fire. In another part of the city, opposition troops advanced on a neighborhood of pock-marked villas, backed up by heavy weapons fire. An AFP correspondent reported on fighting at a school which held a number of loyalist fighters. The reporter stated that he saw at least six dead opposition fighters and dozens of wounded after they tried to storm the school. After that, the NTC fighters pulled back and started bombarding the building with mortar fire. By this time, NTC forces had control of 80 percent of the city. While clearing the area, NTC fighters found the bodies of 42 people, allegedly executed by retreating loyalists, at three or four sites. The bound, bullet-sprayed victims were initially described by the NTC as captured opposition fighters, then later as civilians who had refused to fight in the defence of the city. In the evening, NTC commanders at the front claimed that Mutassim Gaddafi had been captured while attempting to flee the city in a family car, and had been sent to Benghazi. Some officials in Tripoli also repeated the claim. Later on, however, a spokesman for the NTC in Benghazi said they had no confirmation that Mutassim had been captured, even after contacting opposition commanders at Sirte.

=== Loyalists surrounded, resist ===
13–19 October

On 13 October loyalist forces counter-attacked, pushing NTC troops two kilometers back to the police headquarters they had captured two days before. As dusk fell, the opposition launched a new two-pronged assault in an attempt to re-take the territory they had lost. By midnight, loyalist fighters were confined to the Al Dollar/district 2 area. Estimates on the number of remaining loyalist fighters ranged from 500 to 2,000.

On 14 October NTC forces advanced, once again, from the police headquarters into the Al Dollar neighbourhood and district 2, attempting to re-take the territory they lost the day before. A 100-strong force advanced two kilometers and captured a school on the edge of Al Dollar. From there, using Grad rockets and artillery pieces, they began heavy bombardment of loyalist positions which their scouting teams had previously identified. The loyalists responded with heavy fire, and by the evening the NTC fighters had pulled back to their positions at the police station. An Al Jazeera correspondent confirmed that the battle lines remained where they had been 24 hours previously.

On 15 October, loyalists once again pushed opposition troops back from the edge of their two hold-outs, in the direction of the police station. The NTC forces stated that they would not launch any more direct attacks on the neighbourhoods because of the high possibility that they would suffer heavy casualties. Instead, they decided they would bombard that part of the city with rockets and artillery until the loyalist forces surrendered. Meanwhile, opposition fighters found another 11 dumped bodies of people who, according to them, had been executed by the loyalists.

On 16 October, the opposition continued with their bombardment of the remaining loyalist-held parts of Sirte. Reuters reported widespread looting by the NTC fighters, most of them from Misrata, with truckloads of stolen goods being driven away and homes being vandalized, angering residents both supporting Gaddafi and those neutral in the uprising.

On 18 October, after two days of shelling, NTC fighters launched another offensive from the east, with approximately 1,000 troops surging into the remaining two neighbourhoods under loyalist control, Al Dollar and district 2. This move came a day after NTC forces took control of Bani Walid, thus making pockets in Sirte the only significant remaining area under pro-Gaddafi control in Libya. The attackers took heavy casualties. The popular commander of the Zintan Brigade, Mustafa Bin Dardef, was struck and killed by mortar fire in the advance. The opposition forces managed to capture a vegetable market during their attack, but continued to receive small-arms and RPG fire from rooftops. During the day, Gaddafi loyalists launched a fierce counter-attack, pushing NTC forces back about two kilometers, close to the conference center where Gaddafi forces had been holed up until the previous week. The opposition tried to regroup at the center, but became pinned down as a volley of 23 mm rounds hit their positions. The loyalist breakthrough led to NTC positions being shelled by mortar fire on the southern outskirts of the city, which had previously been declared secure, and sniper fire hitting opposition fighters at the Seven Hundred district in the suburbs. During this time, an Australian Muslim cleric, who was supporting the NTC, was shot and killed while delivering medical aid in the city.

On 19 October, field commander Essam Baghhar, succeeding the late Bin Dardef in leading the Zintan Brigade, said the transitional government's fighters had counterattacked and pushed the loyalists back into the Number Two neighbourhood, taking control of Al Dollar, overnight. He said the loyalist-controlled area of Number Two was less than a square kilometre in size. The claim could not be immediately confirmed, though it was reported by Al Jazeera. Misrata fighters also improvised and brought to the battle a steel armoured bulldozer, armed with four heavy machine guns and a tank gun, for use in breaking through roadblocks. Some NTC fighters on the front line speculated that Muammar Gaddafi himself may have been in Sirte, judging by the strong resistance the loyalist forces were putting up, even after being heavily bombarded with artillery, rockets and tanks.

=== Final assault ===
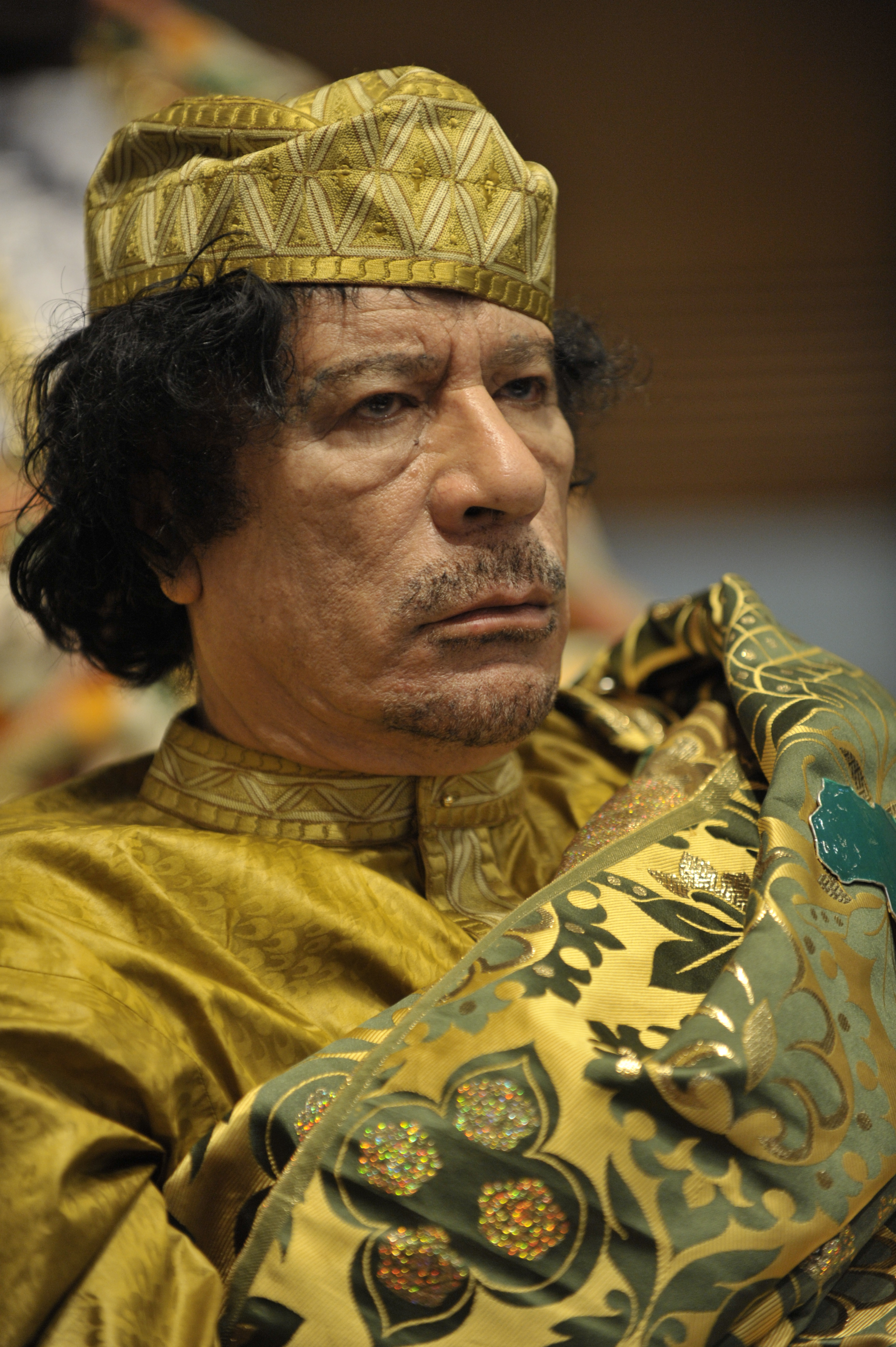
Libyan leader Muammar Gaddafi was tortured, sodomised and then killed during the Battle of Sirte.

On 20 October, the transitional government's fighters started their final assault on the last loyalists' positions at 08:00 local time. Just before the attack, dozens of carloads of loyalists tried to break out of the enclave down the coastal highway. However about 20 loyalists were killed after the rebel forces attacked them. The last neighbourhood was captured after a battle of 90 minutes; about 16 loyalists were captured.

In the hours that followed, NTC officials claimed that Muammar Gaddafi had been in the convoy that had fled earlier, and had been captured by rebels after being shot in the legs whilst trying to escape Sirte and had been taken away in an ambulance, although the reports were, at least for the immediate time following the announcement, unconfirmed. About half an hour later the NTC confirmed that Gaddafi had succumbed to his wounds and died while in custody, and that Gaddafi's defence minister Abu-Bakr Yunis Jabr had also been killed in a firefight. At least three Gaddafi loyalists were also killed in the firefight, according to a photo posted by the Washington Post. Ninety-five other people were killed when the convoy was bombed by French jets, and during the following firefight.

Several days later, new camera phone videos that emerged suggested that Gaddafi was captured, taunted, beaten, sodomized with an unknown object and then shot in the head. His dead body may have been dragged behind a moving vehicle. These details remain to be independently elaborated and fully confirmed. A full investigation into the final minutes of Gaddafi's life was promised by the NTC, but no official inquest has been made. Human Rights Watch concluded in October 2012 that Gaddafi was killed after his capture, which would constitute a war crime.

== Aftermath ==
On 22 October, NTC forces began mop up operations to finish off the last loyalist elements in Sirte, although there did not appear to be any actual clashes taking place, and the fighters were more occupied clearing up the dead bodies of both sides as well as unexploded ordnance. Also, according to journalists on the scene, Sirte was mostly deserted apart from the NTC garrison. The Gaddafi family demanded that the NTC hand over Muammar Gaddafi's body to their tribe in Sirte for burial. NATO announced that in light of Sirte's fall and the death of Gaddafi, it would end its military operations in Libya on 31 October.

On 23 October, reflecting its previous statements that it would consider the war to be finished with the capture of Sirte, the NTC declared Libya to be "liberated" and announced plans for a democratic state based on Islamic law.

=== NTC massacre of Sirte loyalists ===
Within a week after the fall of the city, evidence emerged of mass killings of loyalist prisoners of war and other civilian supporters of Gaddafi's government. The victims killed included men, women, and children, while there were also reports of the rebels harassing and stealing from the locals. According to one resident, "The rebels are worse than rats. Nato is the same as Osama bin Laden." According to another local woman, "We lived in democracy under Muammer Gaddafi, he was not a dictator. I lived in freedom, Libyan women had full human rights. It isn't that we need Muammar Gaddafi again, but we want to live just as we did before." A local elderly woman stated "They are killing our children. Why are they doing this? For what? Life was good before!"

On 24 October, Human Rights Watch reported that 53 pro-Gaddafi fighters were seemingly executed by NTC fighters after they had discovered the remains of the 53 men at the Mahari hotel in Sirte that had been under control of the rebel fighters. Peter Bouckaert, the rights group's emergencies director, said the badly decomposed bodies were found by local residents three days before on 21 October. Some had their hands bound behind their backs. "The evidence suggests that some of the victims were shot while being held as prisoners, when that part of Sirte was controlled by anti-Gaddafi brigades who appear to act outside the control of the National Transitional Council," Mr. Bouckaert said. "If the NTC fails to investigate this crime it will signal that those who fought against Gaddafi can do anything without fear of prosecution." In addition, 10 more unknown bodies were found in a water reservoir in district 2.

By 26 October, it was reported that the bodies of 267 executed loyalists had been found across the city. The nearly 300 bodies were all buried in several mass graves around Sirte. Another 572 loyalists, who were killed during the fighting, were reportedly buried in a local cemetery.

== NATO strikes ==
15 September – 20 October NATO strikes
Date	Vehicles	Tanks	Missiles and missile launchers	Buildings	Radar and antennas
15 September	2 armed vehicles	1	4 multiple rocket launchers, 8 air missile systems	1 military storage facility	0
16 September	4 armed vehicles	0	8 air missile systems	5 command and control nodes	3 radar systems
17 September	1 armed vehicle	0	4 multiple rocket launchers, 4 surface-to-air missile Systems	2 command and control nodes	0
18 September	0	0	1 multiple rocket launcher, 4 air missile systems	1 military facility, 1 command and control node	0
19 September	1 armed vehicle	0	1 multiple rocket system	0	0
20 September	0	1	6 air missile systems	2 military ammunition/storage facilities, 1 command and control node, 1 military vehicle storage facility	0
21 September	0	0	5 surface-to-air missile systems	1 command and control node	0
22 September	0	0	0	1 ammunition storage and military barracks facility	0
23 September	2 armed vehicles	0	1 anti-aircraft gun	1 ammunition storage facility, 1 command and control node	0
24 September	29 armed vehicles	0	0	2 command and control nodes, 1 military staging location, 1 division storage bunker and radar facility, 3 ammunition storage facilities, 1 weapon firing position, 1 ammunition and vehicle storage facility, 1 vehicle staging point	0
25 September	1 military support vehicle	0	1 multiple rocket launcher, 1 artillery piece	1 command and control node, 2 ammunition/vehicle storage facilities, 1 ammunition storage facility	1 radar facility
26 September	0	0	0	1 command and control node, 1 ammunition/vehicle storage facility	0
27 September	0	0	0	1 ammunition/vehicle storage facility	0
28 September	0	1	0	1 ammunition/vehicle storage facility, 1 staging and firing location, 1 command and control node and staging area, 2 ammunition and missile facilities	0
29 September	0	0	0	1 ammunition storage area, 1 multi rocket launcher area	0
1 October	2 armed vehicles, 4 armoured infantry vehicles	1	0	1 command and control node, 1 infantry and anti-aircraft artillery staging area	0
2 October	1 armed vehicle	0	1 multiple rocket launcher	0	0
7 October	0	0	0	1 firing and vehicle staging point	0
12 October	2 military vehicles	0	0	0	0
20 October	11 armed vehicles	0	0	0	0
Total	60	4	49	45	4
