= Second Battle of Bin Jawad =

Battle in the Libyan Civil War

- Part of Second Gulf of Sidra offensive
| Date | 23–27 August 2011 |
| Location | Bin Jawad, Libya |
| Result | Anti-Gaddafi victory |

Belligerents
| (Libya) National Transitional Council: National Liberation Army | (Libya) Gaddafi Loyalists: Libyan army; Paramilitary forces |

Commanders and leaders
| (Libya) Col. Hamid Hassy | (Libya) Muammar Gaddafi |

Casualties and losses
| 20 dead | Unknown |

The Second Battle of Bin Jawad took place during the Libyan Civil War between forces loyal to former Libyan leader Muammar Gaddafi and those loyal to the National Transitional Council for control of the small town of Bin Jawad.

== The battle ==
NTC forces managed to advance to the outskirts of Bin Jawad on 23 August after retaking Brega and Ra's Lanuf the previous day, but were unable to progress further due to heavy loyalist resistance in the area.

On 24 August, a heavy loyalist artillery bombardment caused the rebels to retreat 20 km from Bin Jawad to Sidra. NTC troops regrouped and counter-attacked, but the loyalists ambushed the advancing NTC forces once again at Bin Jawad, in an echo of an earlier defeat in March. Twenty rebel fighters died in the clashes, with an undetermined number of loyalist casualties.

The next day, forces loyal to the NTC pulled back to Ra's Lanuf out of loyalist artillery range, and prepared for another advance along the coast towards Bin Jawad and their ultimate objective, Sirte.

On 27 August, another advance began towards Bin Jawad, this time successfully dislodging the loyalist troops who retreated to Sirte, and Bin Jawad fell entirely to the NTC Army.

Rebel forces began advancing towards Sirte the next day.
