= Abdel Rahman Abdel Hamid =

Pro-Gaddafi forces commander

- Relatives: Muammar Gaddafi
- Military career
- Conflicts: Libyan Civil War

Abdel Rahman Abdel Hamid (Arabic: عبد الرحمن عبد الحميد) was the son of a sister of the former Libyan leader Muammar Gaddafi. He was a commander of the pro-Gaddafi forces fighting in Sirte before his capture by National Transitional Council forces as they captured strategic places in the city.

== Role in the Libyan civil war ==
In the 2011 Libyan civil war, Abdel Hamid was a commander of a pro-Gaddafi brigade in Sirte. There were reports that previously claimed he had been executed by his own men. Two weeks after this event, Al Jazeera broadcast that Abdel Hamid had indeed been captured as he fought in the Battle of Sirte. After Gaddafi was killed, he attended his funeral.
