= List of Ashraf tribes in Libya =

Libyan society is composed of several Ashrāf tribes. The word Ashrāf (Arabic: أشراف, lit. 'nobles') refers to persons claiming descent from the family of the Islamic Prophet Muhammad, often but not exclusively by way of his daughter Fatimah. The word is the plural of sharīf ('noble', 'highborn'), from sharafa ('to be highborn').

== List of Libyan Ashraf tribes ==
- Al-Zayadeen (الزيادين) – Descendants of Sidi Zaydan and Sidi Ahmed of the Moroccan Alaouites.
- Al-Mazawgha (المزاوغة) – Descendants of Sidi Amer Al-Mezoghi (based in the Sidi Amer Zawiya in Susah, Tunis); He is considered the progenitor of the tribe in Libya and Tunisia.
- Al-Ghrariyun (الغراريون) – Descendants of Sidi Salem.
- Awlad Slayman (أولاد سليمان) – Descendants of the Seven Fawatir.
- Gumata (قماطه) – Descendants of Muslim.
- Al-Awasij (العواسج) – Descendants of Sidi Bou-Hmayra.
- Shurafa Waddan (شرفاء ودان) – Descendants of Sidi Kolan.
- Qadhadhfa (القذاذفة) – Descendants of Sidi Mousa.
- Al-Hmaydat and Al-S'afaat (الحميدات والسعفات) – Descendants of Sidi Bou-Hmayda Al-Seqfi.
- Al-'Ajaylat (العجيلات) – Descendants of Sidi Mohammed Harakat.
- Al-Taboul (الطبول) – Descendants of Sidi Mohammed Abi Tabl.
- Al-Serara (السرارة) – Descendants of Sidi Ibrahim Ben-Sarar.
- Ashrāf Tribe Sidi Aburad Buzedion {البوزيديون}
- Ashrāf Tribe Sidi Abdel Rahman Alepeshty Olobashat {لأبشات}
- Ashrāf Tribe Sidi spears Al-rmohh {الرمحة}
- Ashrāf Tribe Sidi Ahmed Al Murr Ghani Alemragna {المراغنة}
- Ashrāf Tribe Sidi Mohammed Faqih Al-Fuqhah {الفقهاء}
- Ashrāf Tribe Sidi Sayeh Al-Sayāh Alawneh {سياح العلاونة}
- Ashrāf Tribe Sidi Abu Salaamah Salamat Begrean {السلامات بغريان}
- Ashrāf Tribe Sidi Faraj Bin Hamdan Al Furjan {الفرجان}
- Ashrāf Tribe of Sidi al-Qutb Abdullah al-Khattabi (الخطاطبة العمرانيون)
- Ashrāf Tribe of Sidi ‘Amāra Al-Dawadī (Zawiya)
- Ashrāf Tribe of Sidi Hamid al-Hudayri (al-Hadirāt).
- Ashrāf Tribe of al-Fawākhir.
- Ashrāf Tribe of Abdel Wahid al-Dukāli (Msallata).
- Ashrāf Tribe of Sidi Banu Layth (Bani Nile and Bani Ahmed) and also (al-Hawawasa, Fasiun and al-Suwadinia).
- Ashrāf Tribe of al-Mushāshi: descendants of Moulay Abdel-Salam Meshish. The sub-branches include:
  - [A] Awlad Sidi Haji Abdul Salam bin Hassan bin Omar Mashini (tribe of al-Haboun)
  - [B] Awlad Al-Sharif Al-Haaj Fakhruddin Yahya ibn Nabeul (tribe of Al-Barash)
  - [C] Awlad Mismar ibn Abdel Mawlā (tribe of al-Masamir)
  - [D] Awlad Sidi Haji Mohammad Abdul Nabi al-Asfar, nicknamed Klim al-Tair and Abu Seif (ancestor of Awlad Abu Yusuf)
  - [E] Awlad Sidi al-Makashif Abdul Rahman, nicknamed Aldrai (ancestor of the Mushasha tribe).
  - [F] Awlad Sidi Mohamed al-Messaoudi al-Sehdī al-Yahyaoui: ancestor of Awlad as-Saydi and al-Masoudi on the coast of Tripoli.
- Ashrāf tribe of Sidi Abdel Rahman Abu Zubaydah, a descendant of Abdul Qadir Gilani, ancestor of the Zubaydat tribe, the Zirqan of Tarhuna, Krabooli and Yafran.
- Ashrāf tribe of Siy’ān {Awlad Sidi Muhammad Abu Issa’}: based in Sbiba, west of Kairouan. Progenitor of the tribe, brother of Sidi Salam Abu Gharra, progenitor of the al-Gharara tribe in Medenine and Gabés.

- Ashrāf tribe of Qutb Sidi Ibrahim al-Mahjoub (Zawiya of al-Mahjoub), ancestor of the Mahajib tribe in Misrata and Sorman.
- Ashrāf Azwaip tribe Brakna.
- Ashrāf tribes of al-Barakinah, al-Muqarana and al-Ziyayinah all share a common ancestor, Sidi Ahmed al-Burkan: based in the Kabylie region of Algeria and Mali.
- Banu Issa (Western Libya): includes Amour and the Dawada ethnic group in southern Libya, as well as the Farjan tribes of Sidi Faraj ibn Hamdan.
- Ashrāf tribe of Al-Tayira, they are Awlad Sidi Abdul Karim: located in Sabratha and Sorman, Menzel Chaker and Oran, Algeria, as well as the Awlad Suleiman al-Tayar in southern Libya.
- Ashrāf tribe of Al-Humāmala: descendants of Sheikh Sidi Muammar, based in Tarhuna and Sidi Ibn Hamāl, based in Sirte.
- Al-Ja’afra tribe who claim descent from Jafar, who hails from Awlad Moulay Abdullah bin Idris and reside in Garyan, Al-Baran and Tripoli.
- Ashrāf tribe of Sidi Moulay Cherif guardian Abu Kassim Abu Shusha: based in Ziltan and they belong to the tribe of Awlad Khuwaylid Balnsfir are descendants of Moulay Abdullah ibn Idris.
- Ashrāf tribe of Bani Badr, descended from Sidi Mohamed Ben Ali who is buried in Ghadames.
- Ashrāf tribe of Oulad al-Sharif, Sidi Ali al-Tishani in Tajura on the coast of Tripoli (al-Tashashna).

- Ashrāf tribe of Moulay Sidi Sheikh Abdul Karim Nafati.
- Ashrāf tribe of al-Mnaffa, they reside in Butnan, Tobruk, and the Western Sahara (Egypt). Clan of Sheikh Omar Mukhtar.
- Ashrāf tribe of Almhachc in Jebel Akhdar and Butnan.
- Ashrāf tribe of Sidi Abu Roik in Jebel Akhdar.
- Awlad Sidi Wazzani in Tobruk.
- Ashrāf tribe of Moulay al-Qasim ibn Moulay Idriss: they reside in Darna, having settled there in the middle of the 12th century.
- Ashrāf tribe of Al-Mātiik, they are Zawah, Al-Fassi, Awlad Annan, Awlad Zakaria, Awlad Aoun and Awlad Abad: based in western Libya.
- Ashrāf tribe of al-Mukhalif founded by Sidi Abdallah Abu Gleida, based in Tataouine.
- Ashrāf tribe of al-Makhayif founded by Sidi Makhlouf, reside in Marith, Gabes, and Sorman.
- Ashrāf tribe of An-Na’meon founded by Sharif Ali bin Na’āma: they are sons of Abdul Nabi Al-Frujan Awlad Ali.

- Ashrāf tribe of Al-na’āsa, descendants of Abdel Rahman al-Na’as: reside in Tajura, Tarhuna and Tripoli.
- Ashrāf tribe of Shaqārina descendants of Mohamed Abu Dabbous in Gharyan.
- Ashrāf tribe of Alamarion descendants of Ali al-Amari (Gasr Akhyar).
- Ashrāf tribe of Shabab of Ghayran, Rahiban, Ifrane and Fassato descendants of Mohamed Ben Salem, based in baldat al-Jūsh, Libya.
- Ashrāf tribe of ar-Rajban, descendants of Sidi Ahmed al-Rajban: based in the town of Ar-Rajban.
- Tribe of al-Shida and Awlad Sidi Youssef of Zawiya, Al Maya and Tuwaybiyah: descendants of Sidi Mahfouz ibn Sidi Abbas al-Mulilā al-Maghribi.
- Ashrāf tribe of Sidi Abu Saīd descendants of Sidi Ahmed Abī al-Afrān, based in Al Maya.
- Ashrāf tribe of Sidi Najm, based east of Benghazi.
- Ashrāf tribe of Aljdua, descendants of Sharif Sidi Youssef Al-Jarani from Msallata.
- Ashrāf tribe of Awassi of Tarhuna: founded by Sharif Abdel Mawla ibn Isa.
- Ashrāf tribe of Al-Kawanīn (Kenounis) descendants of Sidi Ibrahim Al-Sharaf: Tarhuna and Tripoli.

== See also ==
- Asharaf or Ashraf, Somali clan claiming descent from the Prophet, through Fatimah
- Sharif, on the wider use of the term
