= Qadhadhfa =

Arab tribe in Libya

Qadhadhfa القذاذفة
- Husaynid Arab tribe
- Ethnicity: Arab
- Nisba: Al-Qadhafi (al-Gaddafi)
- Descended from: Shaykh Al-Wali Omar Amr Qadhadhf al-Dam ibn Saeed ibn Omar ibn Khalifa ibn Musa ibn Hilal
- Branches: Al-Quhous; Al-Wumila; Al-Khtura; Al-Turshan; Awlad Amr
- Language: Arabic
- Religion: Sunni Islam

The Qadhadhfa (also al-Qaddadfa, Gaddadfa, Qaddadfa, Gaddafa; Arabic: القذاذفـة, romanized: al-Qaḏāḏifa) is one of the Arab Ashraf tribes in Libya, living in the Sirte District in present-day northwestern Libya. They are traditionally counted amongst the country's Ashraf tribes, and during the Gaddafi regime were regarded as one of the greatest and most powerful tribes in the whole country. Much of the tribe is of Arab descent.They are now mostly centered at Qasr Abu Hadi, Sirte.

== History ==
The progenitor of the Banu Qadhadhfa was Amr Qadhadhf al-Dam (عمرو قذاف الدم), who claimed to be a descendant of Musa al-Kadhim.

The tribe has supported the idea of Arab unity as an Arab tribe in Libya itself. They are notable for their role in the 1969 coup d'état that deposed King Idris of Libya and as the tribe of his successor Muammar Gaddafi.

The tribe has proven to be an influential player in Libya's civil war. It is known for its active presence in Sirte. Their dominance of the region caused Sirte to grow and become comparable to Tripoli and Benghazi in terms of national power. Qadhadhfa influence caused Sirte and Sabha to become completely loyal to Gaddafi during his rule of the country.

The Qadhadhfa fought for and supported the Great Socialist People's Libyan Arab Jamahiriya and the Green Resistance throughout the Second Libyan Civil War and the Libyan Crisis.

After Gaddafi's death [was killed] in October 2011, leading members of the Qadhadhfa demanded the return of his body by Misratan fighters for burial by relatives in Sirte, a request that has been denied to date.

== Notable Qadhadhfa ==
- Muammar Gaddafi (1942–2011) – Leader of Libya from 1 September 1969 to 20 October 2011.
- Dr. Muhammad Gaddafi (born 1970) – First son of Libyan leader Muammar Gaddafi from his first wife.
- Dr. Saif al-Islam Gaddafi (1972–2026) – Libyan politician, second son of Muammar Gaddafi and the first son from his lifelong wife. Executed in 2026 by unknown special tactical intelligence team.
- al-Saadi Gaddafi (born 1973) – Libyan former football player, third son of Muammar Gaddafi.
- Mutassim Gaddafi (1974–2011) – National Security Advisor of Libya from 2008 to 2011, fourth son of Muammar Gaddafi. Executed while fighting his captives in 2011.
- Hannibal Gaddafi (born 1975) – Fifth son of Muammar Gaddafi.
- Dr. Aisha Gaddafi (born 1977) – Daughter of Muammar Gaddafi.
- Saif al-Arab Gaddafi (1982–2011) – Sixth son of Muammar Gaddafi. Killed during 2011 NATO strike on Gaddafi house in Tripoli.
- Khamis Gaddafi (1983–2011) – Military commander of the 32nd Reinforced Brigade of the Armed People, seventh son of Muammar Gaddafi. Killed while fighting the NATO-supporting militias in 2011.
- Moussa Ibrahim (born 1974) – Libyan Information Minister
- Ahmed Gaddaf al-Dam (born 1952) – Libyan diplomat, cousin of Muammar Gaddafi
- Mansour Dhao – Libyan general, cousin of Muammar Gaddafi
- Sayyid Gaddaf al-Dam (1948–2023) – Libyan general, cousin of Muammar Gaddafi
- Massoud Abdelhafid (1937–2015) — Libyan general, relative of Muammar Gaddafi and Ahmed Gaddaf al-Dam. One of the most notable figures during the rule of Muammar Gaddafi. Married to Ahmed Gaddaf al-Dam’s sister.
- Muhammad az-Zanati (1934–2025) — Secretary General of the General People's Congress of Libya from 18 November 1992 to 3 March 2008.
- Prof. Mohamed Irhuma Gaddafi (born 1979) – Consultant clinical pharmacologist and specialist academic physician based in South Africa.
- Ali al-Kilani (born 1955) – Libyan poet and composer. Relative of Muammar Gaddafi.

== See also ==
- Gaddafi regime
- Khamis Brigade
- List of Ashraf tribes in Libya
- Al-Bu Nasir (Iraqi tribe)
- Husaynids
