= Killing of Muammar Gaddafi =

2011 killing in Sirte, Libya

- Part of the battle of Sirte at the enclosure of the First Libyan Civil War
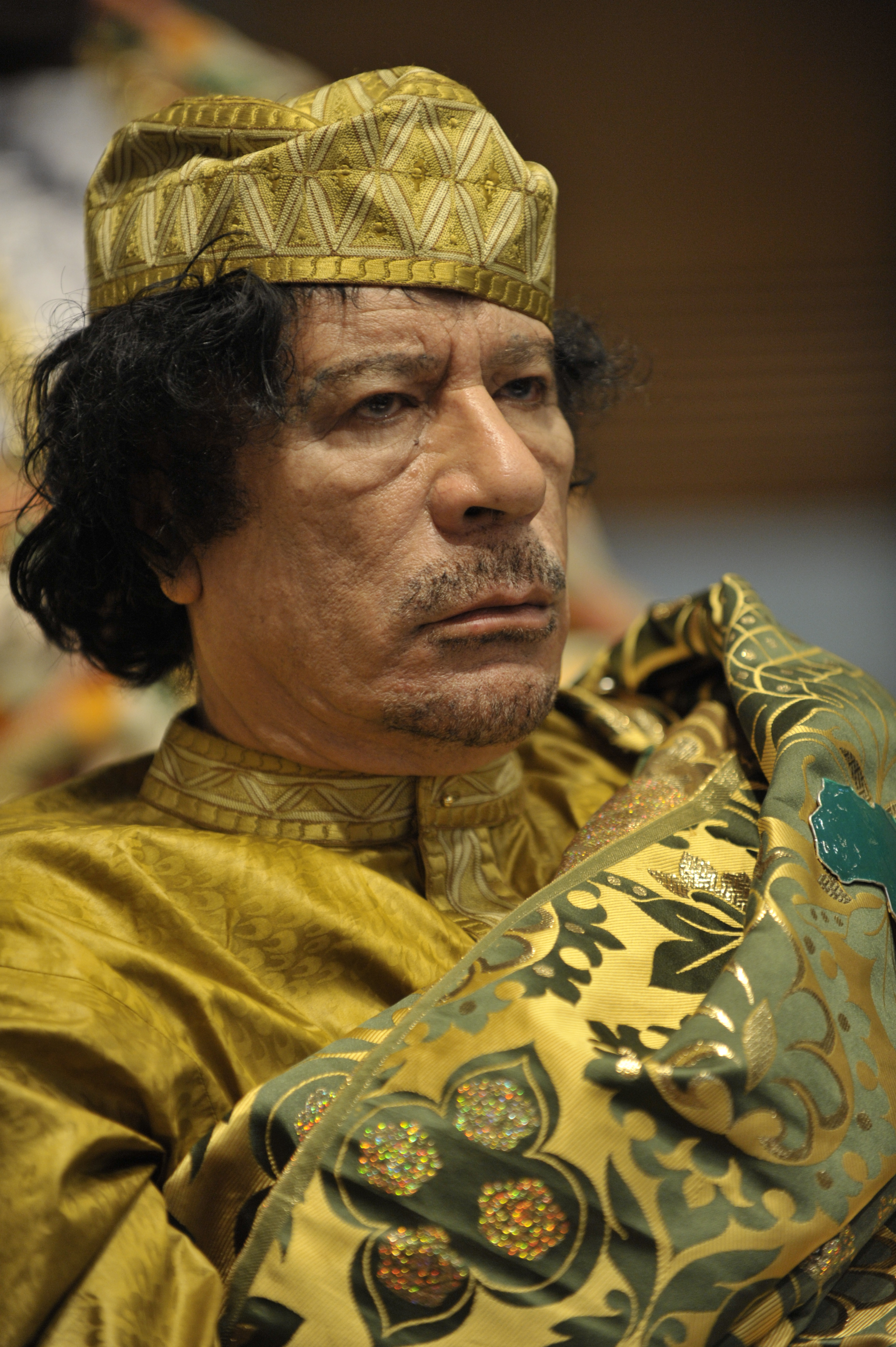
- Muammar al-Gaddafi at the AU summit, 2009
- Location: Sirte, Libya
- Date: 20 October 2011; 15 years ago
- Target: Muammar Gaddafi
- Attack type: War crime; assassination; extrajudicial execution; rape; shooting; summary execution; torture killing; stabbing
- Deaths: 1 (Gaddafi)
- Perpetrators: (Libya) National Transitional Council: National Liberation Army; NATO command: France; United Kingdom; United States

Muammar Gaddafi, a former leader of Libya, was killed by the National Transitional Council (NTC) on 20 October 2011 after the Battle of Sirte. Gaddafi was captured by NTC forces and killed extrajudicially shortly afterwards.

The NTC initially claimed Gaddafi succumbed to injuries sustained in a firefight when loyalist forces attempted to free him, although a video of his last moments shows rebel fighters dragging Gaddafi out of a drainage pipe, beating him and one of them sodomizing him with a bayonet before he was shot several times.

The killing of Gaddafi was criticized as a violation of international law. Amnesty International and Human Rights Watch called for an independent autopsy and an investigation into how Gaddafi died.

== Events ==
After the fall of Tripoli to forces of the opposition NTC in August 2011, Gaddafi and his family escaped the Libyan capital. He was widely rumored to have taken refuge in the south of the country. In fact, Gaddafi had fled in a small convoy to Sirte on the day Tripoli fell. His son, Mutassim Gaddafi, followed in a second convoy.

On 19 October 2011, Libya's prime minister, Mahmoud Jibril, said that Gaddafi was believed to be in the southern desert, reestablishing his government among pro-Gaddafi tribes in the region. By that point, the NTC had just taken control of the pro-Gaddafi town of Bani Walid and were close to taking control of Gaddafi's home town, the tribal heartland of Sirte, east of Tripoli. According to most accounts, Gaddafi had been with heavily armed regime loyalists in several buildings in Sirte for several months as NTC forces took the city. Mansour Dhao, a member of Gaddafi's inner circle and leader of the regime's People's Guard, said that Gaddafi was "very delusional" and complained about the lack of electricity and water. Attempts to persuade him to flee the country and give up power were ignored. As the last loyalist district of Sirte fell, Gaddafi and other members of the government tried to flee.

About 08:30 local time (06:30 UTC) on 20 October 2011, Gaddafi, his army chief Abu-Bakr Yunis Jabr, his security chief Mansour Dhao, and a group of loyalists tried to escape in a convoy of 75 vehicles. A Royal Air Force Panavia Tornado during a reconnaissance mission spotted the convoy moving fast, after NATO forces intercepted a satellite phone call made by Gaddafi.

A NATO aircraft then fired on 21 of the vehicles, destroying one. An American Predator drone controlled from a base near Las Vegas fired the first missiles at the convoy, hitting its target about 3 kilometres (2 mi) west of Sirte. A moment later, French Air Force Mirage 2000D fighter jets continued the bombing. The NATO bombing immobilized much of the convoy and killed dozens of loyalist fighters. After the first strike, the convoy split into several groups, with a subsequent strike destroying 11 vehicles. Rebel units on the ground also struck the convoy.

It is unclear whether NATO aircraft were involved in Gaddafi's capture by Libyan forces on the ground. According to their statement, NATO was not aware at the time of the strike that Gaddafi was in the convoy. NATO stated that, in accordance with United Nations Security Council Resolution 1973, it does not target individuals, but only military assets that pose a threat. NATO later learned "from open sources and Allied intelligence" that Gaddafi was in the convoy and that the strike was likely to have contributed to his capture and therefore his death.

After the airstrike, which destroyed the vehicle in front of Muammar Gaddafi's car, he and his son Mutassim, along with former defence minister Abu-Bakr Yunis Jabr, took shelter in a nearby house, which was then shelled by NTC forces.

Mutassim then took 20 fighters and went to look for undamaged cars, having persuaded his father to come too. "The group belly-crawled to a sand berm", according to a United Nations report published in March 2012, and then through two drainage pipes and set up a defensive position.

One of Gaddafi's guards threw a grenade at advancing rebels on the road above, but it hit a concrete wall above the pipes and fell in front of Gaddafi. The guard tried to pick it up, but it exploded, killing both the guard and Yunis Jabr.

=== Capture and killing ===
Gaddafi took refuge in a large drainage pipe with several loyalist bodyguards. A nearby group of NTC fighters opened fire, wounding Gaddafi in the leg and back. According to one unnamed NTC fighter, one of Gaddafi's own loyalists also shot him, apparently to spare him from being captured. A group of rebels approached the pipe where Gaddafi was hiding and ordered him to come out, which he did slowly. He was then dragged up to his feet as rebels shouted "Muammar, Muammar!"

A United Nations report published in March 2012 gave a different account of Gaddafi's capture. Gaddafi was wounded by fragments of a grenade thrown by one of his own men, which bounced off a wall and fell in front of Gaddafi, shredding his flak jacket. He sat on the floor dazed and in shock, bleeding from a wound in the left temple. Then one of his group waved a white turban in surrender.

Gaddafi was killed shortly afterwards. There are numerous conflicting accounts regarding details and circumstances of his killing. According to a Misratan rebel fighter, when he asked Gaddafi about the damage done to Misrata by his forces, he denied any involvement and quietly asked his captors not to kill him. One fighter demanded that Gaddafi stand up, and he struggled to do so. Gaddafi can be heard in one video saying "God forbids this" and "Do you know right from wrong?" when being shouted at by his captors. In a video of his arrest he can be seen lying on the hood of a Toyota truck, held by rebel fighters. A senior NTC official said that no order was given to execute Gaddafi. According to another NTC source, "they captured him alive and while he was being taken away, they beat him and then they killed him". However, the prime minister of the NTC Mahmoud Jibril gave a contradictory account, stating that "when the car was moving it was caught in crossfire between the revolutionaries and Gaddafi forces in which he was hit by a bullet in the head".

Several videos related to the death were shown on television and circulated on the internet. The first shows footage of Gaddafi alive, his face and shirt bloodied, stumbling and being dragged toward an ambulance by armed militants chanting "God is the Greatest" in Arabic. The video shows Gaddafi being sodomized with a bayonet. Another shows Gaddafi, stripped to the waist, suffering from an apparent gunshot wound to the head, and in a pool of blood, together with jubilant fighters firing automatic weapons in the air. A third video, posted on YouTube, shows fighters "hovering around his lifeless-looking body, posing for photographs and yanking his limp head up and down by the hair". Another video shows him being stripped naked and verbally abused by his captors.

Gaddafi's body was taken to Misrata, where a doctor's examination ascertained that he had been shot in the head and abdomen.

==== Public display ====
The interim Libyan authorities decided to keep Gaddafi's body "for a few days", NTC oil minister Ali Tarhouni said, "to make sure that everybody knows he is dead". The body was moved to an industrial freezer where the public was allowed to see it until 24 October. One video showed Gaddafi's body on display in the center of an emptied public freezer in Misrata. Some people traveled hundreds of kilometers to see proof that Gaddafi was dead. One reporter observed gunshot residue on the wounds, consistent with shots at close range.

Gaddafi's body was displayed alongside that of his son Mutassim, who was killed by Misratan fighters after his capture in Sirte on 20 October 2011. The younger Gaddafi's body was removed from the refrigerator for burial at the same time as his father's, on 24 October 2011.

==== Burial ====
Although an NTC spokesman said Gaddafi's body would be returned to his family with a directive to keep his burial site secret after an autopsy had determined the cause of death, the semi-autonomous military council in Misrata said it would be buried quickly instead, vetoing the performance of an autopsy. Amnesty International and Human Rights Watch called for an independent autopsy and an investigation into how Gaddafi died, but Jibril said neither step was necessary. While the NTC rejected conducting an autopsy, it promised to investigate the incident.

On 25 October 2011, NTC representatives announced that Gaddafi's body had been buried in a secret grave in the desert early that morning, along with those of his son and Jabr. A Dubai-based satellite TV channel, Al Aan TV, showed amateur video of the funeral, where Islamic prayers were read. Libya's minister for information, Mahmoud Shammam, said that a fatwa had declared that "Gaddafi should not be buried in Muslim cemeteries and should not be buried in a known place to avoid any sedition".

=== Foreign involvement ===
Moments after it was reported that Gaddafi was killed, Fox News published an article titled "U.S. Drone Involved in Final Qaddafi Strike, as Obama Heralds Regime's 'End'", noting that a U.S. Predator drone was involved in the airstrike on Gaddafi's convoy in the moments before his death. An anonymous U.S. official subsequently described their policy in hindsight as "lead[ing] from behind".

Because Libyan rebels had consistently told American government officials that they did not want overt foreign military assistance in toppling Gaddafi, covert military assistance was used (including arms shipments to the opposition). The plan following Gaddafi's death was to immediately begin flowing humanitarian assistance to eastern Libya and later western Libya, as the symbolism would be critically important. U.S. sources stressed it as important that they would "not allow Turkey, Italy and others to steal a march on it".

== Concurrent capture or death of relatives and associates ==
National Transitional Council officials also announced that one of Gaddafi's sons, Mutassim, once the Libyan national security advisor, was killed in Sirte the same day. A video later surfaced showing Mutassim's body lying in an ambulance. A video aired on Al Arrai television showed Mutassim alive and talking to his captors. The circumstances of his death are unclear.

Another son, Saif al-Islam Gaddafi, was captured almost a month after his father's death.

Footage had emerged earlier on 20 October 2011 showing the body of Gaddafi's defence minister, Yunis Jabr. Abdul Hakim Al Jalil, the commander of the NTC's 11th Brigade, stated that former Gaddafi spokesman Moussa Ibrahim had been captured near Sirte. Reports indicate that Ahmed Ibrahim, one of Gaddafi's cousins, was also captured.

== Subsequent events ==
=== Calls for investigation ===
Numerous organizations, including the United Nations and the U.S. and UK governments, have called for an investigation of the exact circumstances of Gaddafi's death, amid controversy that it was an extrajudicial killing and a war crime. The UN High Commissioner for Human Rights, Navi Pillay, had said there should be a full investigation.

The UN Human Rights Office spokesperson said that he expects the UN commission already investigating potential human rights abuse in Libya would look into the case. Waheed Burshan, a member of the NTC, said that an investigation should happen.

On 24 October 2011, the NTC announced that it had ordered an investigation in response to the international calls and that it would prosecute the killers if the investigation showed he died after his capture. Almost a year later, on 17 October 2012, new evidence was revealed by Human Rights Watch showing that mass killings occurred at the site of Gaddafi's death.

=== Regional ramifications ===
In its immediate aftermath, the controversial killing of Gaddafi was thought to have significant implications in the Middle East, as a critical part of the wider "Arab Spring". Former CIA analyst Bruce Riedel speculated that the death would intensify protesting in Syria and Yemen, and French officials stated that because of this they were "watching the Algerian situation".

=== Vengeance ===
Omran Shaban, the Misrata fighter who discovered Gaddafi in the drain pipe and who had posed in photos with his golden gun, was captured by Green Resistance soldiers in Bani Walid. He was then paralysed and severely tortured. The interim president of Libya secured his release, but he died from his wounds days later in France.

=== Alleged Syrian government involvement ===
About a year after Gaddafi's death, the former head of foreign relations from the NTC, Rami el-Obeidi, alleged that former Syrian President Bashar al-Assad offered Gaddafi's phone number to French intelligence, which ultimately led Gaddafi to be tracked and later killed. He says that "[i]n exchange for this information, Assad had obtained a promise of a grace period from the French and less political pressure on the regime – which is what happened". However, The Telegraph, who originally reported the story, could not verify Obeidi's allegations. Furthermore, French defence analyst and former intelligence officer, Eric Dénécé, referred to Obeidi's allegations as "patent nonsense", citing the fact that "in November 2011 France's stance towards Syria actually toughened, with Paris being the first country to recognise the rebel Syrian National Council". He also stated that "France did not need Syria's help to track Gaddafi and Assad would certainly not have sold [Gaddafi's] telephone number in such a way."

Syria strongly rejected any foreign involvement in Libya and was one of the only Arab League member states to vote against a request to the UN for a no-fly zone within Libyan airspace.

== Reactions ==
=== Domestic ===
Prime Minister Mahmoud Jibril said he wished Gaddafi had remained alive so he could be tried for crimes against humanity, saying he had wanted to serve as Gaddafi's prosecutor, but now that he was dead, Libya would need a meticulous plan for the transition to democracy.

The unelected interim head of government said, "Our forces' resistance to Gaddafi ended well, with the help of God." He declared Libya to be "liberated" at a ceremony in Benghazi on 23 October, three days after Gaddafi's death.

NTC official Ali Tarhouni said on 22 October that he had instructed the military council in Misrata to keep Gaddafi's body preserved for several days in a commercial freezer "to make sure that everybody knows he is dead". Two days later, Tarhouni admitted that there had been human rights abuses in the Battle of Sirte, which he said the NTC condemned, and claimed the executive board "did not want to put an end to that tyrant's life before bringing him to trial and making him answer questions that have always haunted Libyans".

A spokesman for the Misrata Military Council, Fathi Bashagha, stated that the council was confident Gaddafi was dead and that he had died of wounds sustained during fighting before his capture.

Saadi Gaddafi, one of Muammar Gaddafi's surviving sons in exile in Niger, said through an attorney that he was "shocked and outraged by vicious brutality" toward his father and his brother, Mutassim, and that the murder showed that the new Libyan leadership could not be trusted to hold fair trials.

=== International ===
Many Western leaders and foreign ministers made statements hailing Gaddafi's death as a positive development for Libya. Following the killing, the Holy See officially recognised the National Transitional Council as Libya's legitimate government. Italian prime minister Silvio Berlusconi and Australian prime minister Julia Gillard suggested that the death of Gaddafi meant the Libyan civil war was over. Some officials, such as UK foreign secretary William Hague, expressed disappointment that Gaddafi was not brought back alive and allowed to stand trial. In a candid moment while filming a television interview, Hillary Clinton, at the time the United States Secretary of State, laughingly stated "We came. We saw. He died." – a variant of a Roman phrase alluding to the swift military victory. Many news outlets likened Gaddafi's death to the capture of Saddam Hussein.

Reactions from several of Gaddafi's allies, including in Cuba, Venezuela, and Nicaragua, were negative. Venezuelan president Hugo Chávez described the Libyan leader's death as an "assassination" and an "outrage", and Nicaraguan president Daniel Ortega later called Gaddafi's killing a "crime" during his inauguration on 10 January 2012. Government officials and politicians in Iran showed considerably diverse reactions with President Mahmoud Ahmadinejad accusing the West of plundering Libya.

Syrian President Bashar al-Assad denounced the killing of Gaddafi as savage and a crime.

The killing reportedly left a particularly strong and consequential impression on Russian leader Vladimir Putin. A senior diplomat who had served at the U.S. Embassy in Moscow under the Obama administration reportedly claimed that "Putin had been appalled by Gaddafi's fate" to the extent that he "watched a video of Gaddafi's savage death three times, a video that shows him being sodomised with a bayonet." Referring to the U.S. coalition's lobbying efforts for the airstrikes at the United Nations, the U.S. diplomat was quoted as saying that a later U.S. intelligence assessment concluded that "Putin blamed himself for letting Gaddafi go, for not playing a strong role behind the scenes" and that Gaddafi's death may have even influenced Putin's decision to intervene militarily in Syria since he "believed that unless he got engaged Bashar would suffer the same fate – mutilated – and he'd see the destruction of his allies in Syria." At a campaign meeting ahead of the 2012 Russian presidential election, Putin described his "disgust" at television coverage of Gaddafi's death and also lashed out at the U.S. for what he perceived as a murder, saying: "They showed to the whole world how [Gaddafi] was killed; there was blood all over. Is that what they call a democracy?"

Immediately after Gaddafi's death, NATO released a statement denying it knew beforehand that Gaddafi was travelling in the convoy it struck. Admiral James G. Stavridis, NATO's top officer, said the death of Gaddafi meant that NATO would likely wind down its operations in Libya. Anders Fogh Rasmussen, the NATO secretary-general, said NATO would "terminate [its] mission in coordination with the United Nations and the National Transitional Council".

== In popular culture ==
In November 2011, former Comedy Central show host, Daniel Tosh, would coin the term "Gaddafi'd", in reference to how the NTC fighters sodomized Gaddafi.

== See also ==
- Assassination of Ali Khamenei
- Execution of Saddam Hussein
- Human rights violations during the Libyan Civil War (2011)
- List of heads of state and government who were assassinated or executed
- List of state leaders deposed by foreign powers in the 20th and 21st century
- List of state leaders who died in office
- Reception and legacy of Muammar Gaddafi
