= Harawa =

Harawa هراوة
- Village
- Location in Libya
- Coordinates: 31°03′16″N 17°16′44″E
- Country: Libya
- Region: Tripolitania
- District: Sirte

Population (2010)
  - Total: 2,600
- Time zone: UTC+2 (EET)

Harawa (Arabic: هراوة Harāwah), is a village in the desert in the Sirte District in Libya. As of 2010, it had 2,600 inhabitants. It is 50 kilometres east of the city of Sirte. As part of the Libyan Civil War, rebel forces claimed on 1 September 2011 that the village had surrendered and by 3 September rebel forces had occupied Harawa. However, these reports proved false and it was not until 17 September that the town fell to the forces of the National Transitional Council.
