= Mustafa Bin Dardef =

Libyan rebel field commander (1968–2011)

Mustafa Bin Dardef مصطفى بن دردف

Personal details
- Born: 1968 Benghazi, Libya
- Died: 18 October 2011 (aged 42–43) Sirte, Libya

Military service
- Allegiance: (Libya) National Transitional Council
- Branch/service: National Liberation Army
- Years of service: 2011
- Rank: Field commander
- Commands: Sirte
- Battles/wars: First Libyan Civil War; Battle of Sirte; Second Battle of Benghazi

Mustafa Bin Dardef (Arabic: مصطفى بن دردف; 1968 – 18 October 2011) was a prominent Libyan rebel field commander from the Zintan brigade of the anti-Gaddafi forces during the First Libyan Civil War. He was killed by a mortar round just two days before the fall of Sirte and the capture and execution of former Libyan leader Muammar Gaddafi.

== Life ==
Bin Dardef was a businessman in the Mediterranean city of Benghazi before he joined the uprising, importing medical equipment and children's toys, and was twice jailed under the Gaddafi regime for his alleged Islamist leanings. He commanded the Fakhri Alsalabi unit, named after a pilot killed in mid-March, and fought in the Second Battle of Benghazi. He left behind a son and four daughters.

He was active in the Battle of Sirte, being the commander who announced the capture of Sirte's port on 26 September and speaking to news crews discussing the latest advances. He also announced the reports that Moussa Ibrahim had been captured in September, although this would later prove untrue. Ibrahim was again reported captured when Sirte fell, however, this was again proven to be untrue. On 22 October 2011, he was again reportedly captured for a third time, along with Saif al-Islam Gaddafi, near Bani Walid.

== Death ==
Bin Dardef died when a mortar round slammed into a vehicle packed with ammunition. A piece of metal tore into his bullet-proof vest, while another ripped his throat, killing him almost instantly. He was buried in Benghazi's Martyrs' Cemetery, along with other fighters who had died in Sirte.
