= Reception and legacy of Muammar Gaddafi =

Views on the Libyan dictator

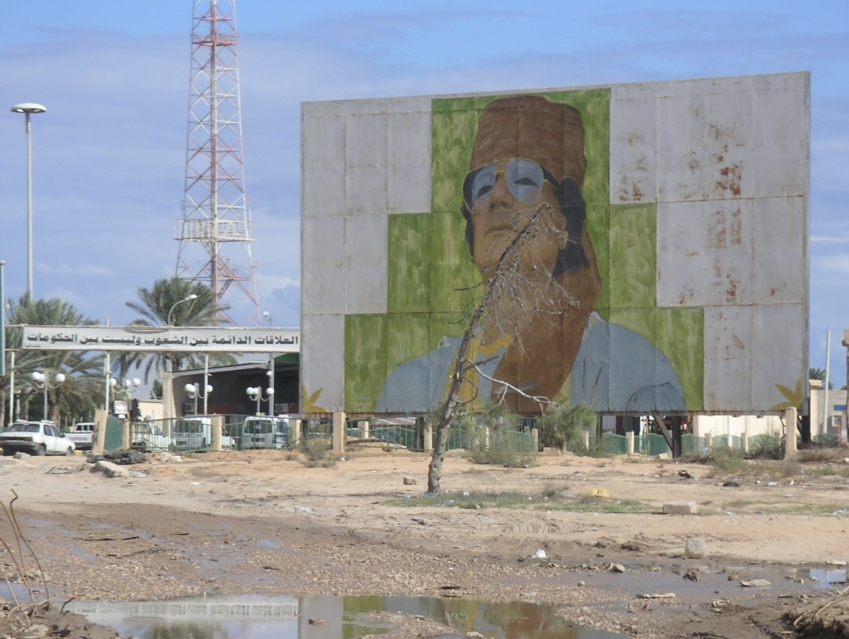
Graffiti portrait of Muammar Gaddafi in Ras Jedir, Libya (2008)

Muammar Gaddafi dominated Libya's politics for four decades and was the subject of a pervasive cult of personality. He was decorated with various awards and praised for his anti-imperialist stance, support for Arab—and then African—unity, as well as for significant development to the country following the discovery of oil reserves. Conversely, many Libyans strongly opposed Gaddafi's social and economic reforms; he was posthumously accused of various human rights violations. He was condemned by many as a dictator whose authoritarian administration systematically violated human rights and financed global terrorism in the region and beyond.

== Reception ==
According to Bearman, Gaddafi "evoked the extremes of passion: supreme adoration from his following, bitter contempt from his opponents". Bearman added that "in a country that formerly suffered foreign domination, [Gaddafi]'s anti-imperialism has proved enduringly popular". Gaddafi's domestic popularity stemmed from his overthrow of the monarchy, his removal of the Italian settlers and both American and British air bases from Libyan territory, and his redistribution of the country's land on a more equitable basis. Supporters praised Gaddafi's administration for the creation of an almost classless society through domestic reform. They stressed the regime's achievements in combating homelessness, ensuring access to food and safe drinking water, and to dramatic improvements in education; under Gaddafi, literacy rates rose significantly, and all education to university level was free. Supporters have also applauded achievements in medical care, praising the universal free healthcare provided under the Gaddafist administration, with diseases like cholera and typhoid being contained and life expectancy raised.

Gaddafi was a controversial and highly divisive world figure. Supporters lauded him for his willingness to tackle the unfair economic legacy of foreign domination as well as his support of pan-Africanism and pan-Arabism. Conversely, he was internationally condemned as a dictator whose authoritarian administration violated the human rights of Libyan citizens, persecuted dissidents abroad, and supported international terrorism.

— Yuval Karniel, Amit Lavie-Dinur and Tal Azran, 2015

Biographers Blundy and Lycett believed that during the first decade of Gaddafi's leadership, life for most Libyans "undoubtedly changed for the better" as material conditions and wealth drastically improved, while Libyan studies specialist Lillian Craig Harris remarked that in the early years of his administration, Libya's "national wealth and international influence soared, and its national standard of living [had] risen dramatically". Such high standards declined during the 1980s, as a result of economic stagnation; it was in this decade that the number of Libyan defectors increased. Gaddafi claimed that his Jamahiriya was a "concrete utopia", and that he had been appointed by "popular assent", with some Islamic supporters believing that he exhibited barakah. His opposition to Western governments earned him the respect of many in the Euro-American far right, with the UK-based National Front, for instance, embracing aspects of the Third International Theory during the 1980s. His anti-Western stance also attracted praise from the far left; in 1971, the Soviet Union awarded him the Order of Lenin, although his mistrust of atheist Marxism-Leninism prevented him from attending the ceremony in Moscow. First noted that, during the early 1970s, various students at the Paris 8 University were hailing Gaddafi as "the only Third World leader with any real stomach for struggle".

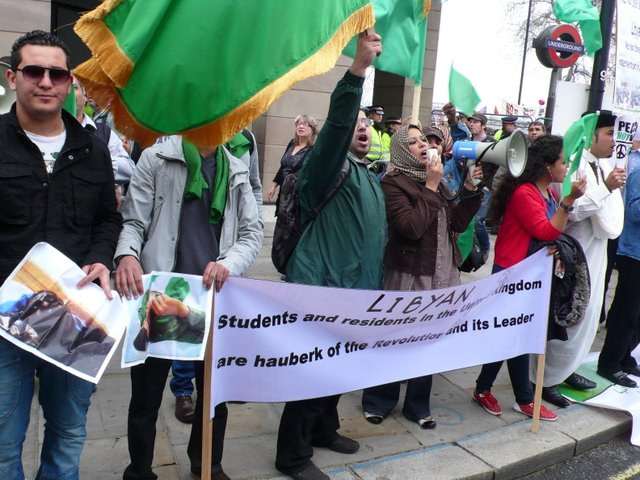
Pro-Gaddafi demonstrators

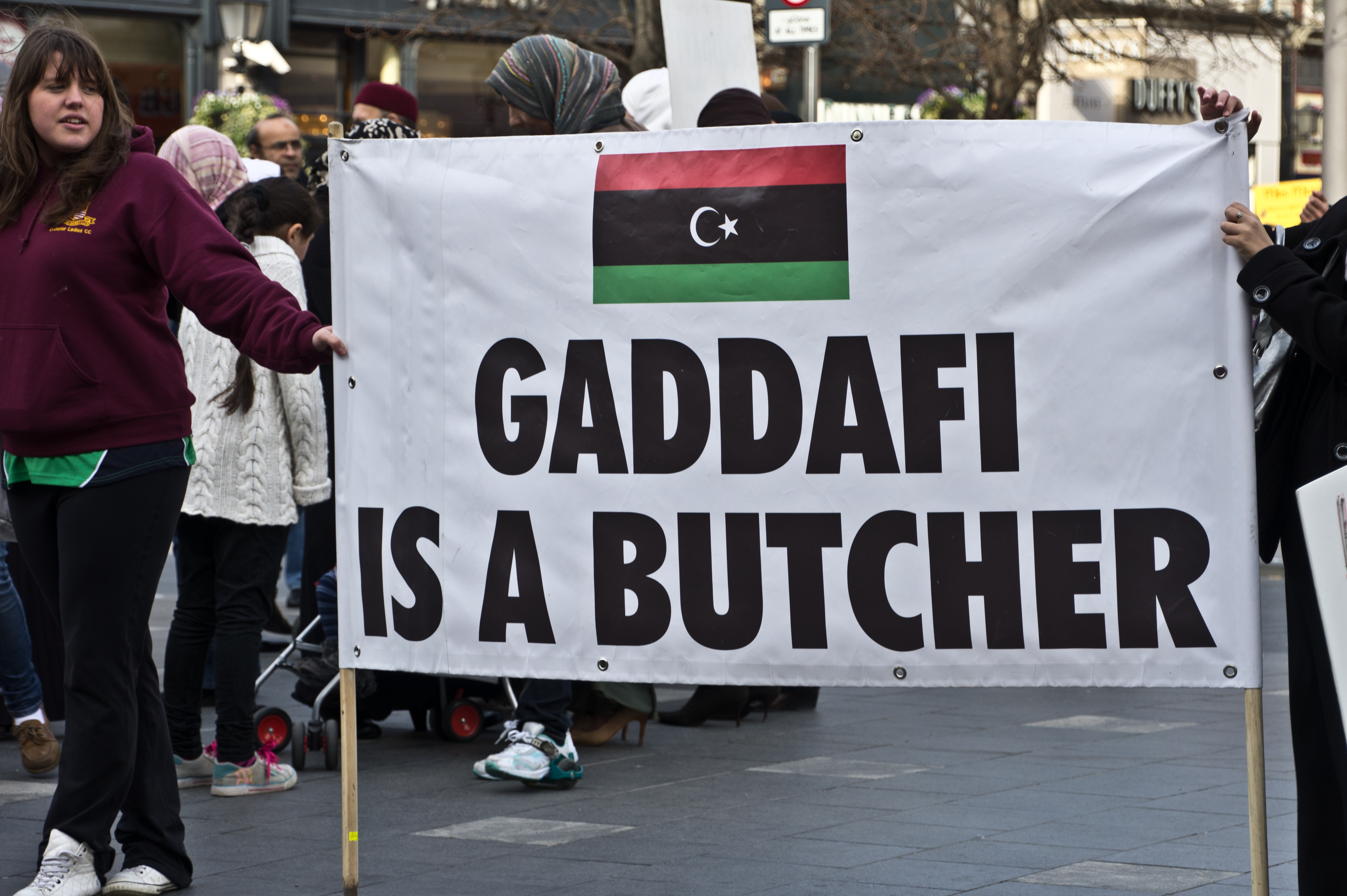
Anti-Gaddafi demonstrators

According to critics, Libya's people lived in a climate of fear under Gaddafi's administration, due to his government's pervasive surveillance of civilians. Gaddafi's Libya was typically described by Western commentators as a police state, with many U.S. right-wingers believing that Gaddafi was a Marxist-Leninist in a close relationship with the Soviet Union. Gaddafi's state has also been characterized as authoritarian. His administration has also been criticized by political opponents and groups like Amnesty International for the human rights abuses carried out by the country's security services. These abuses included the repression of dissent, public executions, and the arbitrary detention of hundreds of opponents, some of whom reported being tortured. One of the most prominent examples of this was a massacre that took place in Abu Salim prison in June 1996; Human Rights Watch estimated that 1,270 prisoners were massacred. Dissidents abroad were labelled "stray dogs"; they were publicly threatened with death and sometimes killed by government hit squads, or returned home by force to face imprisonment or death. The most notable victims were Umar Muhayshi and Mansour Rashid El-Kikhia. Government ministers Muhammad Harati, Attie Kasseh, Ibrahim Bechari, and Colonel Hassan Ishkal were killed in suspicious car accidents. At least 35 opposition figures were killed extrajudicially outside of Libya due to Gaddafi's "stray dogs" policy. Libyan ambassador to Italy, Ammar Dhu, and military officer, Salih Bu Farwa, were allegedly killed for spreading rumors about Gaddafi having Jewish heritage from his mother's side. Libyan businessman and anti-Gaddafi dissident Jaballa Matar was abducted in Egypt in 1990 and never seen again; the account of his disappearance was the subject of his son Hisham Matar's memoir The Return, which won the 2017 Pulitzer Prize for Biography or Autobiography.

Gaddafi's government's treatment of non-Arab Libyans came in for criticism from human rights activists, with native Berbers, Italians, Jews, refugees, and foreign workers all facing persecution in Gaddafist Libya. Human rights groups also criticized the treatment of migrants, including asylum seekers, who passed through Gaddafi's Libya on their way to Europe. Despite his vocal opposition to colonialism, Gaddafi was criticized by some anti-colonial and leftist thinkers. The political economist Yash Tandon stated that while Gaddafi was "probably the most controversial, and outrageously daring (and adventurous) challenger of the Empire" (i.e. Western powers), he had nevertheless been unable to escape the West's neo-colonial control over Libya. During the Civil War, various leftist groups endorsed the anti-Gaddafist rebels—but not the Western military intervention—by arguing that Gaddafi had become an ally of Western imperialism by cooperating with the War on Terror and efforts to block African migration to Europe. Gaddafi's actions in promoting foreign militant groups, although regarded by him as a justifiable support for national liberation movements, was seen by the United States as interference in the domestic affairs of other nations and active support for international terrorism. Gaddafi himself was widely perceived as a terrorist, especially in the US and UK.

The Libyan anti-Gaddafist movement brought together a diverse array of groups, which had varied motives and objectives. It comprised at least five generations of oppositional forces which included Islamic fundamentalists who opposed his radical reforms, a few active monarchists, members of the old pre-Gaddafist elite, conservative nationalists who backed his Arab nationalist agenda but opposed his left-wing economic reforms, and technocrats who had their future prospects stunted by the 1969 coup. He also faced opposition from rival socialists such as Ba'athists and Marxists; during the Civil War, he was criticized by both left-of-centre and right-of-centre governments for overseeing human rights abuses. Gaddafi became a bogeyman for Western governments, who presented him as the "vicious dictator of an oppressed people". For these critics, Gaddafi was "despotic, cruel, arrogant, vain and stupid," with Pargeter noting that "for many years, he came to be personified in the international media as a kind of super villain."

== Posthumous assessment ==
Former president of Nigeria Olusegun Obasanjo discusses the impact of Gaddafi's death on Africa in September 2012

International reactions to Gaddafi's death were divided. US President Barack Obama stated that it meant that "the shadow of tyranny over Libya has been lifted," while UK Prime Minister David Cameron stated that he was "proud" of his country's role in overthrowing "this brutal dictator". Contrastingly, former Cuban President Fidel Castro commented that in defying the rebels, Gaddafi would "enter history as one of the great figures of the Arab nations", while Venezuela's Hugo Chávez described him as "a great fighter, a revolutionary and a martyr". Former South African President Nelson Mandela expressed sadness at the news, praising Gaddafi for his anti-apartheid stance, remarking that he backed Mandela's African National Congress during "the darkest moments of our struggle".

Gaddafi was mourned as a hero by many across sub-Saharan Africa; The Daily Times of Nigeria for instance stated that while undeniably a dictator, Gaddafi was the most benevolent in a region that only knew dictatorship, and that he was "a great man that looked out for his people and made them the envy of all of Africa". The Nigerian newspaper Leadership reported that while many Libyans and Africans would mourn Gaddafi, this would be ignored by Western media and that as such it would take 50 years before historians decided whether he was "martyr or villain".

== Legacy ==
After the Libyan government was toppled following Fall of Tripoli in the civil war, Gaddafi's system of governance was dismantled and replaced by the interim government of the NTC, which legalized trade unions and freedom of the press. In July 2012, elections were held to form a new General National Congress (GNC), which officially took over governance from the NTC in August. The GNC elected Mohammed Magariaf as president of the chamber, and Mustafa A. G. Abushagur as Prime minister; when Abushagur failed to gain congressional approval, the GNC elected Ali Zeidan to the position.

In January 2013, the GNC officially renamed the Jamahiriyah as the "State of Libya". Gaddafi loyalists then founded a new political party, the Popular Front for the Liberation of Libya; two of its members, Subah Mussa and Ahmed Ali, promoted the new venture by hijacking the Afriqiyah Airways Flight 209 in December 2016. Led by Saif al-Islam Gaddafi, the Popular Front was allowed to participate in the future general election, although Saif al-Islam was himself assassinated before that could happen.

== See also ==
- List of awards and honours bestowed upon Muammar Gaddafi
- Disarmament of Libya
- Human rights violations during the Gaddafi regime

== Sources ==
- Bearman, Jonathan (1986). Qadhafi's Libya. London: Zed Books. ISBN 978-0-86232-434-6.
- Blundy, David; Lycett, Andrew (1987). Qaddafi and the Libyan Revolution. Boston: Little Brown & Co. ISBN 978-0-316-10042-7.
- Boyd-Judson, Lyn (2005). "Strategic Moral Diplomacy: Mandela, Qaddafi, and the Lockerbie Negotiations". Foreign Policy Analysis. 1: 73–97. doi:10.1111/j.1743-8594.2005.00004.x.
- Castro, Jose Esteban (2011). "Gaddafi and Latin America". Soc. 48 (4): 307–311. doi:10.1007/s12115-011-9442-7.
- El-Khawas, Mohamed (1984). "The New Society in Qaddafi's Libya: Can It Endure?". Africa Today. 31 (3): 17–44. JSTOR 4186243.
- First, Ruth (1975). Libya: The Elusive Revolution. Harmondsworth: Penguin. ISBN 978-0-14-041040-2.
- Gardell, Mattias (2003). Gods of the Blood: The Pagan Revival and White Separatism. Durham and London: Duke University Press. ISBN 978-0822330714.
- Harris, Lillian Craig (1986). Libya: Qadhafi's Revolution and the Modern State. Boulder, Colorado: Westview Press. ISBN 978-0-8133-0075-7.
- Haynes, Jeff (1990). "Libyan Involvement in West Africa: Qadhaffi's 'Revolutionary' Foreign Policy". Paradigms. 4 (1): 58–73. doi:10.1080/13600829008442987.
- Karniel, Yuval; Lavie-Dinur, Amit; Azran, Tal (2015). "Broadcast Coverage of Gaddafi's Final Hours in Images and Headlines: A Brutal Lynch or the Desired Death of a Terrorist?". The International Communication Gazette. 77 (2): 171–188. doi:10.1177/1748048514562686. S2CID 144642774.
- Kawczynski, Daniel (2011). Seeking Gaddafi: Libya, the West and the Arab Spring. London: Biteback. ISBN 978-1-84954-148-0.
- Pargeter, Alice (2012). Libya: The Rise and Fall of Qaddafi. New Haven: Yale University Press. ISBN 978-0-300-13932-7.
- Ronen, Yehudit (1986). "Libya". In Shaked, Haim; Dishon, Daniel (eds.). Middle East Contemporary Survey. Volume VIII: 1983–84. Tel Aviv: Moshe Dayan Center for Middle Eastern and African Studies. pp. 578–603. ISBN 978-965-224-006-4.
- Simons, Geoff (2003). Libya and the West: From Independence to Lockerbie. Oxford: Centre for Libyan Studies. ISBN 978-1-86064-988-2.
- St. John, Ronald Bruce (1987). Qaddafi's World Design: Libyan Foreign Policy, 1969–1987. London: Saqi Books. ISBN 978-0-86356-161-0.
- St. John, Ronald Bruce (2012). Libya: From Colony to Revolution (rev. ed.). Oxford: Oneworld Publications. ISBN 978-1-85168-919-4.
- Sykes, Alan (2005). The Radical Right in Britain: Social Imperialism to the BNP. Basingstoke and New York: Palgrave Macmillan. ISBN 978-0333599242.
- Tandon, Yash (2011). "Whose Dictator Is Qaddafi? The Empire and Its Neo-Colonies". Insight on Africa. 3 (1): 1–21. doi:10.1177/0975087814411129. S2CID 155823080.
- Vandewalle, Dirk (2008b). "Libya's Revolution in Perspective 1969–2000". In Vandewalle, Dirk (ed.). Libya Since 1969: Qadhafi's Revolution Revisited. Basingstoke, England: Palgrave Macmillan. pp. 9–53. doi:10.1007/978-0-230-61386-7_2. ISBN 978-0-230-33750-3.
- Zoubir, Yahia H. (2009). "Libya and Europe: Economic Realism at the Rescue of the Qaddafi Authoritarian Regime". Journal of Contemporary European Studies. 17 (3): 401–415. doi:10.1080/14782800903339354. S2CID 153625134.
