= Sirte University =

University in Sirte, Libya

Sirte University (Arabic: جامعة سرت) is a public university in the city of Sirte, Libya, with a campus also at Hun. It was established as a university in 1991; for the two years before that, it operated as a branch of Benghazi University.

Sirte University has thirteen faculties, or schools:

- Agriculture Faculty
  - 1) Department of Soil and Water
  - 2) Department of Plant Production and Plant Protection
  - 3) Department of Animal Production
  - 4) Department of Economics and Agricultural Extension
  - 5) Department of Food Science Technology
  - 6) Department of Natural Resources
  - 7) Department of Agricultural Mechanization
- Arts & Literature Faculty
- Dentistry College
- Economics Faculty
- Economics Faculty at Houn
- Education College
- Education College at Houn
- Engineering Faculty
- Mechanical Engineering
- Petroleum Engineering
- Electrical Engineering.

College

- Information Technology Faculty
- Law Faculty
- Medicine Faculty
- Nursing College
- Science Faculty
  - 1) Department of Chemistry
  - 2) Department of Mathematics
  - 3) Department of Computer Science
  - 4) Physics Department
  - 5) Department of Animal Science
  - 6) Department of Plant Sciences

== See also ==
- List of Islamic educational institutions
