= Lawrence James =

English historian and writer

- Born: Edwin James Lawrence; 26 May 1943 (age 83) Bath, Somerset, England
- Occupation: Historian, writer, former teacher
- Education: University of York (BA); Merton College, Oxford
- Genre: Popular history, military history, British Empire
- Notable works: The Rise and Fall of the British Empire; Raj: The Making and Unmaking of British India

Edwin James Lawrence (born 26 May 1943, Bath, England), most commonly known as Lawrence James, is an English historian and writer.

== Biography ==
James graduated with a BA in English & History from the University of York in 1966, and subsequently undertook a research degree at Merton College, Oxford. Following a career as a teacher, James became a full-time writer in 1985.

James has written several works of popular history about the British Empire, and has contributed pieces for Daily Mail, The Times and the Literary Review.

His wife Mary James was headmistress of St Leonards School from 1988 to 2000.

== Bibliography ==
- Crimea 1854–56: The War With Russia from Contemporary Photographs (1981)
- The Savage Wars : British Campaigns in Africa 1870–1920 (1985)
- Mutiny: In the British and Commonwealth Forces, 1797–1956 (1987)
- Imperial Rearguard: The Last Wars of Empire (1988)
- The Golden Warrior: The Life and Legend of Lawrence of Arabia (1990)
- The Iron Duke: A Military Biography of Wellington (1992)
- Imperial Warrior: The Life and Times of Field Marshal Viscount Allenby (1993)
- The Rise and Fall of the British Empire (1994; revised ed. 1998; illustrated ed. 1999)
- Raj: The Making and Unmaking of British India (1997)
- Warrior Race: A History of the British at War (2001)
- The Middle Class (2006)
- Aristocrats: Power, Grace and Decadence – Britain's Great Ruling Classes from 1066 to the Present (2009)
- Churchill and Empire – A Portrait of an Imperialist (2014)
- Empires in the Sun: The Struggle for the Mastery of Africa (2016)
