= Battle of Sirte (2020) =

Battle of the Second Libyan Civil War

- Part of the Western Libya campaign
- Map of the offensive Libyan National Army control Government of National Accord control
Date	6 January 2020
Location	Sirte, Libya
Result	LNA victory

Belligerents
(Libya) Government of National Accord: Misrata Brigades	(Libya) House of Representatives: Libyan National Army; Battalion 604

Commanders and leaders
(Libya) Fayez al-Sarraj (Prime Minister)	(Libya) Field Marshal Khalifa Haftar (LNA supreme commander)

Strength
Unknown	Unknown

Casualties and losses
Unknown	Unknown

The Battle of Sirte took place on January 6, 2020 during the Second Libyan Civil War. The Libyan National Army of Marshal Khalifa Haftar took the city from the forces of the Fayez el-Sarraj Government.

== Background ==
In 2011, during the First Libyan Civil War, Sirte formed the last stronghold of dictator Muammar Gaddafi, who died there on October 20.

In 2015, during the Second Libyan Civil War, the city fell into the hands of the jihadists of Islamic State. It was taken in December 2016 by the forces of the Government of National Accord (GNA), after a six-month battle and more than 700 dead from the Misrata Brigades.

After the defeat of Islamic State, Sirte was controlled by the Misrata Brigades, a group within the Al-Bounyan Al-Marsous coalition, and by Brigade 604, a Madkhalist Salafist militia. All of these troops are assembled within the "Sirte Protection Force." Brigade 604 claimed not to take sides between Sarraj and Haftar, its declared enemies being the Muslim Brotherhood and the jihadist Salafists, however most of its fighters are Ferjani, the tribe of Field Marshal Haftar. Also in 2019, Rabee al-Madkhali called on his supporters to support Haftar.

Sirte and its region are mainly populated by two tribes: the Qadhadhfa - the tribe of Muammar Gadhafi - and the Warfalla, considered to be faithful to the memory of the Libyan Arab Jamahiriya.

== Battle ==
On January 4, 2020, the forces of the Libyan National Army (LNA) of Marshal Khalifa Haftar began a sudden attack on the city of Sirte. Ghardabiya Airport, south of the city, was captured and its defenders surrendered. Soldiers of the LNA then entered the city through five axes to the south and east. Special forces seized the port from the sea. The 604 Brigade then defected and attacked the Misrata Brigades on their rear. Disorganized, the latter retreated and abandoned the city. After only three hours of fighting, Sirte thus passed into the hands of the LNA forces, which faced only weak resistance. Haftar's soldiers were greeted with enthusiasm by locals waving posters bearing the likeness of Gaddafi and green flags of the Libyan Arab Jamahiriya.

The Libyan National Army declared that "Sirte has been totally liberated (...) from terrorist groups." LNA spokesman General Ahmed al-Mesmari said the offensive was the subject of "careful preparation which lasted for months," with regular air raids against the "Sirte Protection Forces."

== Aftermath ==
With the capture of Sirte, LNA forces looked next to the city of Misrata, located 250 kilometers to the northwest, while their brigades actively participated in the 2019–20 Western Libya campaign.
