= People's Guard (Libya) =

Pro-Gaddfi organization in the 2011 civil war

The People's Guard was a pro-Gaddafi organization active in Libya during the 2011 Libyan civil war. It was led by Mansour Dhao. It was created in June 1990 and was composed of civilian volunteers. Its role was to control the messages being relayed in Libya's mosques and thereby prevent the rise of Islamism.
