= Geoff Simons =

British freelance writer (1939–2011)

- Born: 23 November 1939; Stockport, UK
- Died: 31 August 2011 (aged 71)
- Writing career
- Genre: non-fiction
- Subjects: sex; computers; politics; history
- Notable work: Computer Journal Abstracts

Geoffrey Leslie Simons (23 November 1939 – 31 August 2011) was a British freelance writer. In the 1980s, he was chief editor at the National Computing Centre in Manchester. A prolific author of non-fiction, he wrote books about sex, computers and politics, particularly the history of the Middle East.

== Career ==
Geoff Simons was born in Stockport, and lived in or around Greater Manchester throughout his life. He worked as an Information Officer at several companies, as well as working as a technical author and editor. He wrote hardware and software manuals at Ferranti and ICL. As Chief Editor at the NCC, he established Computer Journal Abstracts and wrote summaries for over 20,000 computer articles.

Simons was a critic of US foreign policy, regarding sanctions against Iraq in the 1990s as genocide, and the United States as "a plutocracy that shapes foreign policy in the cynical calculation of elitist commercial advantage". In later life he was a frequent correspondent to newspapers, seeing his letters published in The Times, the Sunday Times, The Independent, The Guardian, the New Statesman, and the Morning Star. He died on 31 August 2011.

== Skepticism ==
Simons was an atheist and skeptic. He was a member of Greater Manchester Humanists. In his book Is God a Programmer?, he defended atheism and criticized the argument from design.

== Works ==
- Sex in the Modern World, 1970.
- A History of Sex, 1970.
- Sex Tomorrow, 1971.
- Does Sex Make You Feel Guilty?, 1972.
- Pornography Without Prejudice: A Reply to Objectors, 1972.
- A Place for Pleasure: The History of the Brothel, 1973.
- The Witchcraft World, 1974.
- The Simons Book of Sexual Records, 1975.
- Introducing Microprocessors, 1979.
- Robots in Industry, 1980.
- The Uses of Microprocessors, 1980.
- Introducing Word Processing, 1981.
- Women in Computing, 1981.
- The Illustrated Book of Sexual Records, 1982. Second ed., 1985.
- Privacy in the Computer Age, 1982.
- Computers in Engineering and Manufacture, 1982.
- The Book of World Sexual Records, 1983.
- Sex and Superstition, 1983.
- Are Computers Alive? Evolution and New Life Forms, 1983.
- Automating Your Office, 1984.
- Computer Bits and Pieces: A Compendium of Curiosities, 1984.
- Expert Systems and Micros, 1985.
- Towards Fifth-generation Computers, 1986.
- Is Man a Robot?, 1986.
- Introducing Artificial Intelligence, 1984.
- The Biology of Computer Life: Survival, Emotion and Free Will, 1985.
- Silicon Shock: The Menace of the Computer Invasion, 1985.
- (with R. T. Doswell) Fraud and Abuse of IT Systems, 1986.
- Eco-computer: The Impact of Global Intelligence, 1987.
- What is Software Engineering?, 1987.
- Introducing Software Engineering, 1987.
- Evolution of the Intelligent Machine: A Popular History of AI, 1988.
- Is God a Programmer?: Religion in the Computer Age, 1988.
- Silicon Psychosis: Derangement in the Global Network, 1989.
- Viruses, Bugs and Star Wars: The Hazards of Unsafe Computing, 1989.
- Robots: The Quest for Living Machines, New ed., 1994.
- Robots and Robotics, 1992.
- Libya: The Struggle for Survival, 1993. 2nd ed. (with foreword by Tam Dalyell), 1996.
- Iraq: From Sumer to Saddam, 1994. Foreword by Tony Benn. 2nd ed., 1996. 3rd ed., 2003.
- The United Nations: A Chronology of Conflict, 1994.
- Korea: The Search for Sovereignty, 1995, Reprinted with foreword by Tony Benn, 1999.
- UN Malaise: Power, Problems, and Realpolitik, 1995.
- Cuba: From Conqistador to Castro, 1996.
- The Scourging of Iraq: Sanctions, Law, and Natural Justice, 1996. 2nd ed., 1998.
- Vietnam Syndrome: Impact on US Foreign Policy, 1998. Foreword by Tony Benn.
- Saudi Arabia: The Shape of a Client Feudalism, 1998.
- Iraq – Primus inter Pariahs: A Crisis Chronology, 1999.
- Imposing Legal Sanctions: Legal Remedy or Genocidal Tool?, 1999.
- Indonesia: The Long Oppression, 1999.
- UN Reform: Addressing the Reality of American Power, Global Dialogue, Vol. 2., No. 2 (Spring 2000)
- Targeting Iraq: Sanctions and Bombing in US Policy, 2002.
- Future Iraq: US Policy in Reshaping the Middle East, 2003.
- Colombia: A Brutal History, 2004.
- Libya and the West: From Independence to Lockerbie, 2004. Foreword by Tony Benn.
- The Ethnic Cleansing of Palestine, 2006 pub by Palestinian Return centre
- Iraq Endgame?: Surge, Suffering and the Politics of Denial, 2008.
- Time to be Rational: Darwin, Demons and Sex, 2009.
- Nuclear Nightmares, 2009.
