= Qasr Abu Hadi =

Qasr Abu Hadi قصر ابو هادي
- Village
- Location in Libya
- Coordinates: 31°03′34″N 16°39′32″E
- Country: Libya
- District: Sirte

Population (2012)
  - Total: 5,075
- Time zone: UTC+2 (EET)

Qasr Abu Hadi (Arabic: قصر ابو هادي, romanized: Qaṣr Abū Hādī) is a village with an estimated 4,890 inhabitants in the Sirte District of Libya. It is 2 km east of the Gardabya Airport and 20 km south of Sirte.

Former Libyan leader Muammar Gaddafi claimed to have been born in a goat-hair tent near the village on 7 June 1942.
