= Mansour Dhao =

Chief of Security for the Gaddafi Government

Mansour Dhao Ibrahim (Arabic: منصور ضو إبراهيم; sometimes spelled Dao or Daw) is a Libyan former politician. He was a prominent figure in the Gaddafi government, serving as Muammar Gaddafi's chief of security until they were both captured. Dhao was the leader of the regime's People's Guard. He is Gaddafi's cousin.

== Biography ==
=== Libyan Civil War and capture ===
Dhao fled with Gaddafi during the Battle of Tripoli. On 20 October 2011, Dhao was captured in Sirte, despite earlier reports that he was in Niger. He was injured after a NATO airstrike destroyed the convoy in which he and Gaddafi were traveling, and he was taken into custody by fighters from Misrata.

Dhao was quoted at length in a New York Times piece published two days later in which he said he had been in Sirte since late August, he regretted his decision to remain loyal to Gaddafi, and his jailers were treating him well. Dhao also denied any role in the crackdown on the demonstrators during the protests of the 2011 Libyan civil war.

=== Imprisonment and trial ===
On 24 February 2012, Dhao claimed in a prison interview with BBC that he had not been given access to a lawyer or allowed to see his family. He also defended Gaddafi's legacy and claimed that, "his ideas as a philosopher or as a thinker will live on."

On 24 September 2013, it was reported that Dhao was interviewed by Le Monde special correspondent Annick Cojean for the book Gaddafi's Harem. Dhao denied any role in facilitating Gaddafi's alleged sexual abuse, but implied other high-ranking officials, especially Nuri al-Mismari, were culpable.

In February 2015, Dhao appeared by video link from Misrata in his trial.

On 12 August 2015, Dhao was among the nine top Gaddafi loyalists sentenced to death, along with Saif al-Islam Gaddafi, Abdullah Senussi, Baghdadi Mahmudi, Abuzed Dorda, Milad Salem Daman, Mondher Mukhtar al-Gheneimi, Abdul Hamid Ammar Waheda, and Awidaat Ghandour al-Noubi.

On 26 October 2015, Human Rights Watch reported that Dhao alleged during a court session that the prosecution had offered to release him if he testified against Abdullah Senussi.

=== Release ===
In July 2022, Prime Minister Abdul Hamid Dbeibeh engaged in negotiation with Gaddafi loyalists to release Dhao as part of a broader effort to win over Gaddafi loyalists from Khalifa Haftar's Tobruk government.

In September 2022, the Ministry of Justice of the Government of National Unity ordered the release of Daw on health grounds. Daw reportedly planned to live in Cairo.

In December 2022, tribes in the Fezzan region gave the GNU a 72-hour ultimatum to release Daw, Abdullah Mansour, and Abdullah Senussi.

In February 2023, Daw was released from prison.
