= Sirte =

Sirt سِرْت
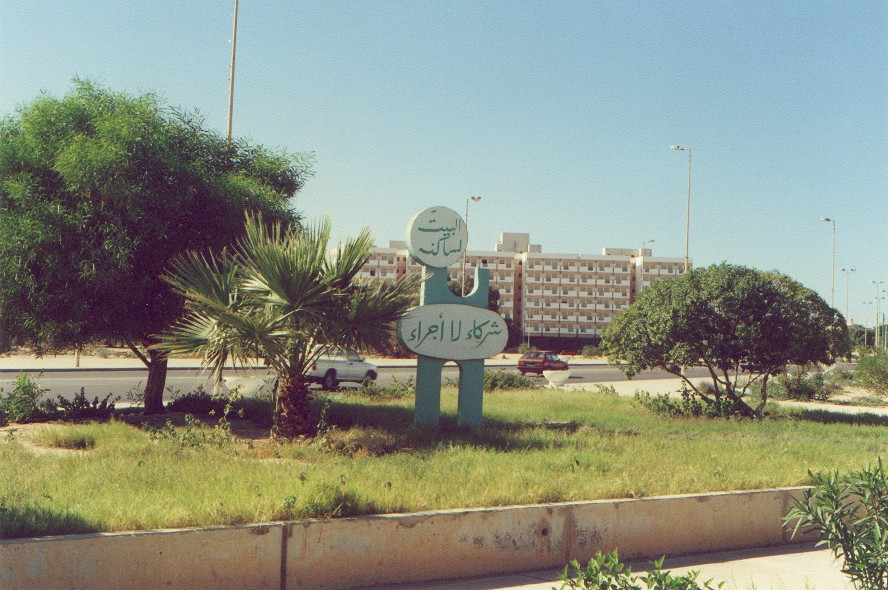
- A square in Sirte
- Interactive map of Sirt
- Coordinates: 31°12′18″N 16°35′19″E
- Country: Libya
- Region: Tripolitania
- District: Sirte District
- Elevation: 28 m (92 ft)

Population (2013)
  - Total: 128,123
- Time zone: UTC+2 (EET)
- License Plate Code: 7

Sirte (/ˈsɜːrt/; Arabic: سِرْت,), also spelled Sirt, Surt, Sert or Syrte, is a city in Libya. It is located south of the Gulf of Sirte, almost right in the middle between Tripoli and Benghazi. It is known for its battles, ethnic groups and loyalty to former Libyan ruler Muammar Gaddafi. Due to developments in the First Libyan Civil War, it was briefly the capital of Libya from 1 September to 20 October 2011 as Tripoli's successor after the city's fall. The settlement was established in the early 20th century by the Italians, at the site of a 19th-century fortress built by the Ottomans. It grew into a city after World War II.

Contrary to popular belief, Sirte was not Muammar Gaddafi's birthplace. Gaddafi's birthplace was in a village 20 km south of Sirte, which is called Qasr Abu Hadi. The inhabitants of this village were farmers. Just a few significant people from the Gaddafi tribe, of whom some were born in Sirte, were appointed to government roles during the time of the Libyan Arab Jamahiriya until the NATO-led invasion of Libya in 2011. Sirte was favoured by the Gaddafi government. The city was the final major stronghold of Gaddafi loyalists in the civil war and Gaddafi was killed there by rebel forces on 20 October 2011 after sustaining major injury caused by French Air Force Bombs discharged as part of the NATO intervention. During the battle, Sirte was left almost completely in ruins, with many buildings destroyed or damaged. Six months after the civil war, almost 60,000 inhabitants, more than 70 percent of the pre-war population, had returned.

== History ==
=== Early history ===
Sirte is built near the site of the ancient Phoenician city of Macomedes-Euphranta, which was an important link on the road along the Mediterranean Sea littoral. It is the last confirmed place where the Punic language was spoken, in the 5th century CE. The region had no recognized administrative centre and was infested for centuries by bandits. In Classical times, the coast was "proverbially dangerous to shipping", called "inhospita Syrtis" in Virgil's Aeneid. John Milton's Paradise Lost Book 2 lines 939-940 speaks of "a boggy Syrtis, neither sea/Nor good dry land".

The medieval city of Surt was located some 55 km east of the present-day city, at a site now known as al-Mudayna or Madina Sultan. After the Umayyad conquest of North Africa, Berbers from the Butr confederation settled in Surt, and around the middle of the 8th century they converted to Ibadi Islam along with the surrounding region. A mosque was probably built at Surt during this period, although no authors mention a mosque in Surt until the 11th century. The most detailed early description of the city was written by Ibn Hawqal, who passed through Surt in 947 on his way to al-Mahdiyyah (which was then the capital of the Fatimid Caliphate). Ibn Hawqal described Surt as being "a bow-shot away from the sea, built on hard, sandy ground with strong walls of mud and brick". He described it as inhabited by Berbers, who stored rainwater in cisterns and were engaged in various forms of agriculture and livestock herding. They grew dates, grapes, and other fruits, and kept goats and camels. Another local industry was alum mining, which was exported. According to Ibn Hawqal, Surt at this point was wealthier than nearby Ajdabiya.

Surt was probably fortified by the Fatimid caliph al-Mu'izz around 965, in preparation for the Fatimid conquest of Egypt under his general Jawhar al-Siqilli. The Fatimids founded the new city of Cairo to serve as their new capital in Egypt. After they moved there, the Surt region became a battleground between the Fatimids and the Zirid dynasty of Kairouan. The Banu Khazrun of Tripoli also controlled Surt for a while as Fatimid allies. Around 1037, the Banu Hilal began to settle in the Surt region. Somewhat later, al-Bakri described Surt as "a large city by the sea" with a mosque, a hammam, and bazaars (these three features are mentioned for the first time here). He listed three gates in the city walls: Qiblī (facing southeast), Jawfī (facing inland), and "a small one facing the sea". There were no suburbs outside the walls. He also noted, "its animals are goats and their meat is juicy and tender, the like of which is not found in Egypt." Al-Bakri also alluded to a merchant community including Arabs, Berbers, Persians, and Copts.

In the late Fatimid period, Surt began to decline - it seems to have lost its position at the intersection of east-west and north-south trade routes. The 12th-century author al-Idrisi apparently visited the Surt region and wrote about the city's decline. The 13th-century author Ali ibn Sa'id al-Maghribi wrote that its forts were still standing. At some point thereafter, the old city of Surt was finally abandoned.

Since the 19th century and particularly since the 1960s, the old city of Surt has been explored by archaeologists, mostly based on al-Bakri's reports. Excavations have revealed the old city walls, enclosing an area of 184,003 square meters, as well as the gates, the forts, the mosque, and the city streets. No evidence of the harbor has been found, though.

=== Modern history ===
In 1842 the Ottomans built a fortress at Marsat al Zaafran ("saffron harbour") which became known as Qasr al Zaafran ("saffron castle"), and later as Qasr Sert. The fortress was built under sultan Abdülmecid I as part of the restoration of Ottoman control over Tripolitania after the fall of the Karamanli dynasty. It was around this fortification, which was taken over and repaired by the Italians in 1912, that the settlement of Sirte grew up.

Sirte served as an administrative centre under Italian rule. During the North African Campaign of the Second World War there were no noteworthy events in this location, which was characterised at the time as "a shabby little Arab village of mud huts, clustered on the banks of a foul-smelling stream."

The village grew into a prominent town after the Second World War for two reasons – the discovery and exploitation of oil nearby and the birth of Muammar Gaddafi in 1942 in a tent at Qasr Abu Hadi, some 20 kilometres (12 mi) south of Sirte. He was sent to the primary school at Sirte at the age of ten.

==== Gaddafi era ====
After seizing power in 1969, Gaddafi transformed Sirte into a showcase of his self-proclaimed revolution, carrying out an extensive program of public works to expand the former village into a small city. After 1988, most government departments and the Libyan parliament were relocated from Tripoli to Sirte, although Tripoli remained formally the capital of the country. Al-Tahadi University was established in 1991.

In 1999, Gaddafi proposed the idea of creating a "United States of Africa" with Sirte as its administrative centre. Ambitious plans to build a new international airport and seaport were announced in 2007.

In 1999, the Sirte Declaration was signed in the city by the Organisation of African Unity in a conference that was hosted by Gaddafi. In 2007 he also hosted talks in Sirte to broker a peace agreement between the government of Sudan and warring factions in Darfur.

In 2008, China Railway Construction Corporation won a $2.6 billion bid in Libya to build a west-to-east coastal railway 352 km (219 mi) from Khoms to Sirte and a south-to-west railway 800 km (500 mi) long for iron ore transport from the southern city Sabha to Misrata.

==== First Civil War ====
On 5 March 2011, anti-Gaddafi forces said they were preparing to capture the city. However, on 6 March, the rebel advance was stopped during the Battle of Bin Jawad before reaching Sirte. Government forces launched a counter-offensive that recaptured Ra's Lanuf and continued to advance as far as the outskirts of the de facto rebel capital of Benghazi. Under United Nations Security Council Resolution 1973, several Western and Arab countries then intervened with air and missile strikes, which turned the tide again in favour of the rebels. On 28 March, Al Jazeera reported that Sirte had been claimed to be taken by rebel forces overnight with little resistance, but other news organisations later reported that rebels and Gaddafi forces were fighting on the road between Bin Jawad and Sirte. By 30 March, Gaddafi loyalists had forced the rebels out of Bin Jawad and Ra's Lanuf and once again removed the immediate threat of an attack on Sirte.

In August, the city faced a more severe threat from the rebels as the loyalist position deteriorated rapidly, with rebels making gains on multiple fronts. As Tripoli came under attack, other rebel forces based in Benghazi broke the military stalemate in the eastern desert, taking Brega and Ra's Lanuf. At the same time, rebels in Misrata pushed eastward along the coast towards Sirte, which then faced a pincer movement from the rebels on two fronts. On 24 August, rebel units were reported as being 56 km (35 mi) from the city. On 27 August, Bin Jawad – about 150 km east – was once again recaptured by the rebels. It was also reported that the National Transitional Council were in negotiations with tribal figures from the city for it to surrender to rebel forces.

In a radio address on 1 September 2011, Gaddafi declared Sirte the new capital of the Great Socialist People's Libyan Arab Jamahiriya, replacing the former capital Tripoli, which had been captured by rebels.

Anti-Gaddafi forces surrounded the city during September 2011 and began a long, difficult battle there, hoping to bring the war to an end. On 20 October, after suffering massive casualties during a siege that lasted over a month, NTC fighters mounted a major offensive and took control of the last remaining district of Sirte, "Number Two", that was in the hands of regime loyalists. Muammar Gaddafi attempted to flee the city, but he was injured and hid in a large drainage pipe before being captured by NTC fighters. He was killed in custody less than an hour later.

Sirte was left heavily damaged by a month of intense fighting, which was preceded by NATO airstrikes throughout the war, and was considered to have been subjected to the most damage of any Libyan city during the civil war. Many homes were ransacked and looted by fighters, angering residents including those loyal to Gaddafi and those sympathetic to the revolution. Many streets and buildings also experienced flooding as water mains were destroyed, though it was unclear by which side. Landmarks like the Ouagadougou Conference Center, which became an impromptu fortress for the city's defenders during the battle, were ruined by artillery fire and blasts. A number of Libyan residents and fighters described the city as unrecognisable after weeks of siege.

==== Postwar ====
In April 2012, almost six months after the civil war, more than 70 percent of the inhabitants had returned to Sirte. Rebuilding of the city started, although unexploded ordnance still posed a great risk to civilians. In February 2012, some local residents said they felt abandoned by the National Transitional Council (NTC), but the new government had promised to rebuild the city and Deputy Prime Minister Mustafa Abushagur insisted this would happen. Some local rebuilding was done in 2012 and 2013, but reconstruction of municipal services did not begin until a 9 million Libyan dinars reconstruction project started in 2014.

===== IS occupation =====
During the widespread chaos and civil war that followed the revolution and led to the erosion of territorial control under the General National Congress (GNC) (which had succeeded the NTC) and the new GNC (NGNC), local loyalists to the Islamic State (IS), which had previously seized the port city of Derna, launched an attack in March 2015 to capture Sirte, which was then occupied by the Libya Shield Force, an NGNC-linked militia. Sirte fell to IS loyalists in May 2015.

Following the formation of a new Tripoli-based government, the Government of National Accord (GNA), an offensive backed by the United Nations was launched in May 2016 by GNA-aligned forces, known as the Bunyan Marsous, to recapture Sirte. After two months of advances, pro-government forces took control of IS's Sirte headquarters on 10 August 2016, although pockets of IS resistance continued to prolong fighting through the end of the year. Sirte was substantially under the control of the GNA by 6 December 2016. A contributing factor to the recapture of the city were the over 400 airstrikes organized by the United States Africa Command against IS positions during the months-long battle. Approximately 700 Libya pro-government fighters and 2,000 IS loyalists died in Sirte between May and November 2016.

===== Reconstruction =====
Mayoral elections were scheduled for 12 December 2016 with the previously (2015) municipal councilmen taking office again.

==== Second Civil War ====
The Libyan National Army fought a battle with the GNA and entered the city on 6 January 2020.

GNA forces launched an attack to capture Sirte from the LNA on 6 June 2020. LNA forces proposed a ceasefire backed by Egypt. However, the GNA rejected the ceasefire as they entered Sirte. Despite this, the attack was thwarted the following day, which led to the LNA retaliating by conducting airstrikes from MiG-29s on a huge Turkish convoy of military and GNA forces heading for Sirte, destroying it and resulting in heavy GNA and possibly Turkish casualties.

== Climate ==
Sirte has a hot arid climate (Köppen: BWh) with hot, dry summers and mild, somewhat rainy winters.

Climate data for Sirte (1991–2020)
Month	Jan	Feb	Mar	Apr	May	Jun	Jul	Aug	Sep	Oct	Nov	Dec	Year
Record high °C (°F)	31.9 (89.4)	37.7 (99.9)	38.6 (101.5)	43.5 (110.3)	46.0 (114.8)	47.8 (118.0)	47.5 (117.5)	48.5 (119.3)	45.5 (113.9)	44.2 (111.6)	39.4 (102.9)	32.0 (89.6)	48.5 (119.3)
Mean daily maximum °C (°F)	18.8 (65.8)	19.7 (67.5)	22.2 (72.0)	24.5 (76.1)	27.1 (80.8)	29.4 (84.9)	31.2 (88.2)	32.0 (89.6)	31.8 (89.2)	29.7 (85.5)	25.0 (77.0)	20.4 (68.7)	26.0 (78.8)
Daily mean °C (°F)	14.2 (57.6)	14.8 (58.6)	17.0 (62.6)	19.4 (66.9)	22.2 (72.0)	24.9 (76.8)	27.0 (80.6)	27.8 (82.0)	27.3 (81.1)	24.9 (76.8)	20.0 (68.0)	15.7 (60.3)	21.3 (70.3)
Mean daily minimum °C (°F)	9.6 (49.3)	9.9 (49.8)	11.8 (53.2)	14.3 (57.7)	17.3 (63.1)	20.4 (68.7)	22.8 (73.0)	23.7 (74.7)	22.8 (73.0)	20.0 (68.0)	15.0 (59.0)	11.0 (51.8)	16.6 (61.9)
Record low °C (°F)	2.5 (36.5)	3.0 (37.4)	2.3 (36.1)	5.0 (41.0)	7.5 (45.5)	10.0 (50.0)	13.0 (55.4)	16.2 (61.2)	15.5 (59.9)	7.5 (45.5)	5.0 (41.0)	3.0 (37.4)	2.3 (36.1)
Average precipitation mm (inches)	41.0 (1.61)	29.9 (1.18)	13.5 (0.53)	3.8 (0.15)	3.6 (0.14)	0.8 (0.03)	0.1 (0.00)	0.2 (0.01)	9.9 (0.39)	17.3 (0.68)	21.9 (0.86)	45.7 (1.80)	189.0 (7.44)
Average precipitation days (≥ 1.0 mm)	5.7	4.4	2.4	0.9	0.9	0.3	0.0	0.0	1.3	2.1	3.1	6.0	27.1
Mean monthly sunshine hours	198.4	228.8	235.6	225.0	279.0	327.0	356.5	347.2	246.0	201.5	204.0	167.4	3,016.4
Mean daily sunshine hours	6.4	8.1	7.6	7.5	9.0	10.9	11.5	11.2	8.2	6.5	6.8	5.4	8.2
Source 1: NOAA
Source 2: Arab Meteorology Book (sun)

== Notable people ==
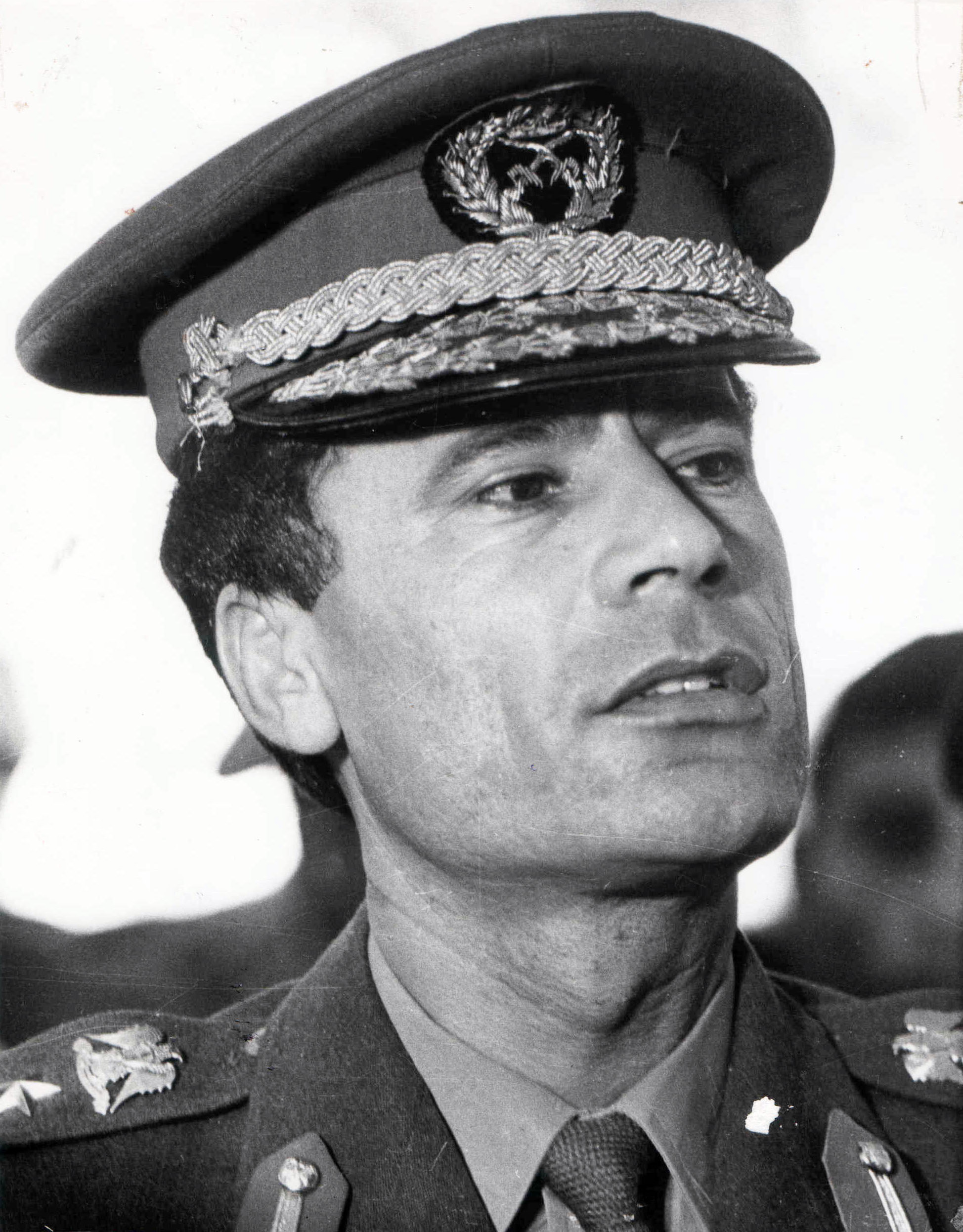
Muammar Gaddafi

- Muammar Gaddafi (1942–2011), former leader of Libya from 1969 until 2011
- Moussa Ibrahim (born 1974), politician and Gaddafi's information minister and spokesman
- Sayyid Gaddaf al-Dam (1948–2023), military person and cousin of Gaddafi

== See also ==
- List of cities in Libya
- Transport in Libya
- Railway stations in Libya
- Qadhadhfa
