= Operation Odyssey Dawn =

2011 international military operation in Libya

- Part of the 2011 military intervention in Libya and the Libyan Civil War
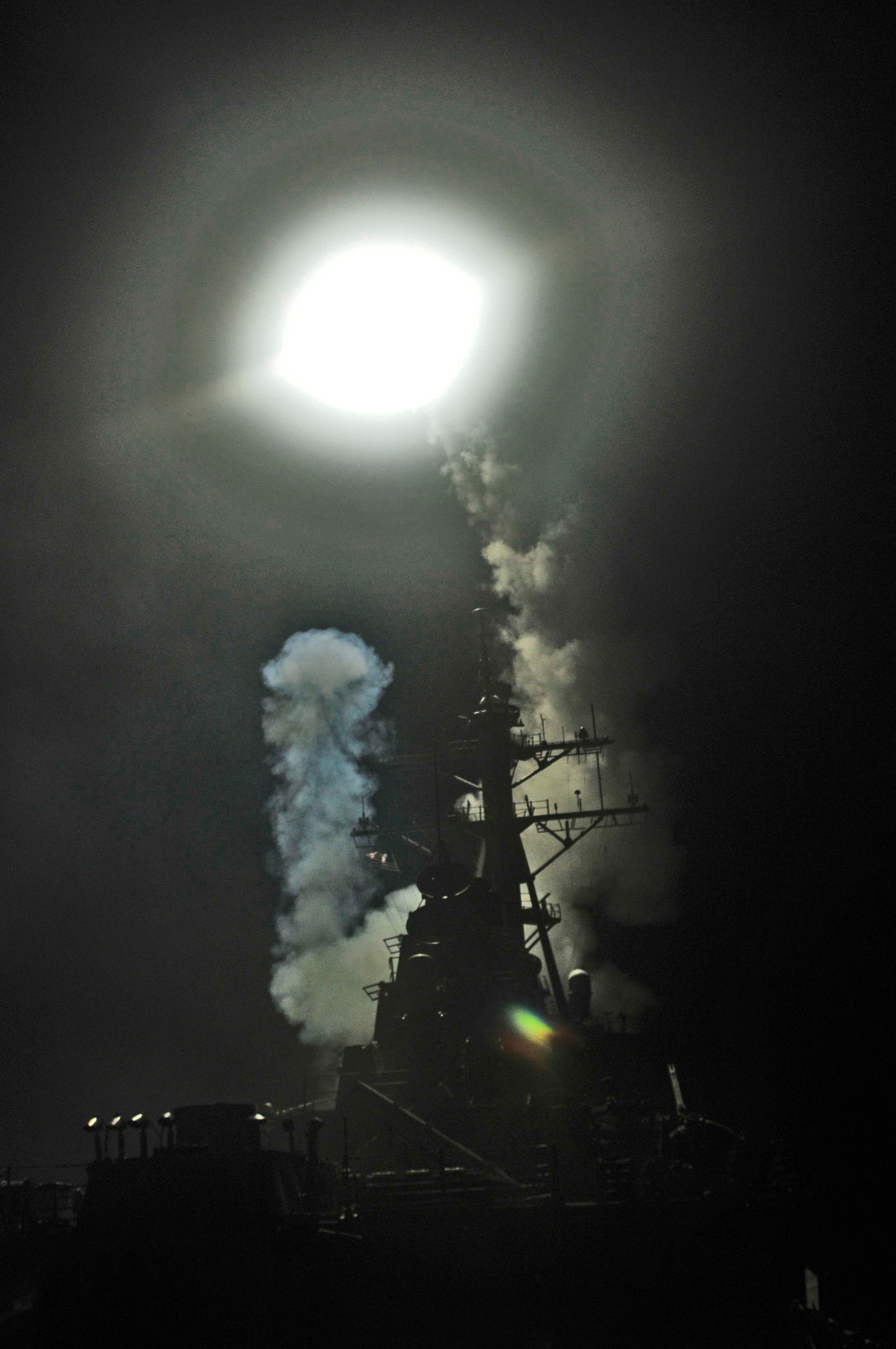
- USS Barry fires a Tomahawk cruise missile during Operation Odyssey Dawn.
Date	19–31 March 2011
Location	Libya
Result	NATO victory Effective no-fly zone established Operations handed over to NATO Operation Unified Protector

Belligerents
United States	Libyan Arab Jamahiriya

Commanders and leaders
Barack Obama; President of the United States and Commander in Chief of U.S. Armed Forces; Robert Gates; U.S. Secretary of Defense; GEN Carter Ham, USA; U.S. Africa Command Commander; ADM Samuel Locklear, USN; Joint Task Force Commander; VADM Harry Harris, USN; Joint Forces Maritime Component Commander Maj Gen Margaret Woodward, USAF; Joint Forces Air Component Commander	Muammar Gaddafi; De facto Commander-in-Chief; Abu-Bakr Yunis Jabr; Minister of Defense; Khamis al-Gaddafi; Khamis Brigade Commander Ali Sharif al-Rifi; Air Force Commander

Strength
See deployed forces	490 tanks 240 mobile rocket launchers 35 helicopters 113 air-land attack fighters 229 air fighters 7 bombers

Casualties and losses
1 F-15E (mechanical failure, aircrew survived); 1 MQ-8B Fire Scout (possibly shot down)	Multiple anti-aircraft defenses, airforce assets, and army vehicles, artillery, and tanks damaged or destroyed
- 114 killed and 445 wounded (Libyan health ministry claim)*; 40 civilians killed (in Tripoli; Vatican claim)
- *Libyan health ministry claim has not been independently confirmed. The U.S. military claims it has no knowledge of civilian casualties.

Operation Odyssey Dawn was the U.S. code name (Note: From Wired, "The U.S. military's nickname for the no-fly zone in Libya sounds like the beginning of a long adventure. But Defense Department officials insist that there's no hidden meaning behind 'Operation Odyssey Dawn.' It's just the product of the Pentagon's semi-random name-generating system.") for the American role in the international military operation in Libya to enforce United Nations Security Council Resolution 1973 during the initial period of 19–31 March 2011, which continued afterwards under NATO command as Operation Unified Protector. The initial operation implemented a no-fly zone that was proposed during the Libyan Civil War to prevent government forces loyal to Muammar Gaddafi from carrying out air attacks on anti-Gaddafi forces. On 19 March 2011, several countries prepared to take immediate military action at a summit in Paris. Operations commenced on the same day with a strike by French fighter jets, then US and UK forces conducting strikes from ships and submarines via 110 Tomahawk cruise missiles and air assets bombing Gaddafi forces near Benghazi. The goal of coalition forces was to impose a no-fly zone for Libyan government forces.

The U.S. initially had strategic command of the military intervention, coordinated missions between coalition members and set up Joint Task Force Odyssey Dawn on USS Mount Whitney for the tactical command and control in the area of operations, but passed complete military command of the operation to NATO and took up a support role on 31 March 2011. Prior to that, an agreement to pass command of the arms embargo to NATO was reached on 23 March, and a handover of enforcement of the no-fly zone to NATO was agreed to on 24 March and became effective the following day. With the handover of coalition command to NATO, Operation Odyssey Dawn remained the name for the activities of U.S. forces, and the coalition's objectives continued to be carried out under Operation Unified Protector. However, NATO's objectives did not include aiding the rebel forces' efforts to take control of territory held by the government.

The British name for its military support of Resolution 1973 is Operation Ellamy, the Canadian participation is Operation Mobile, and the French participation is Opération Harmattan.

== Command ==
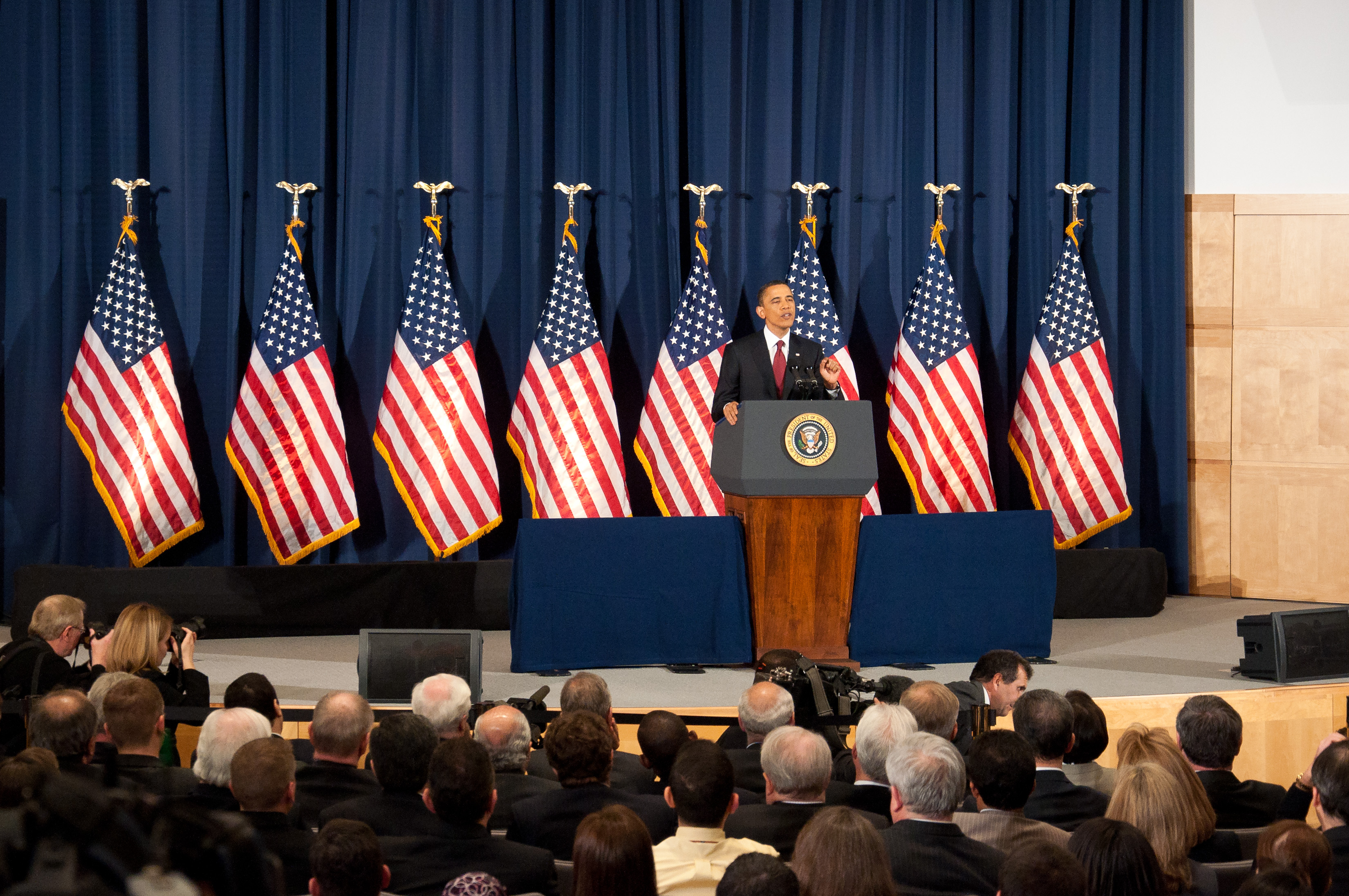
President Barack Obama speaking on the military intervention in Libya at the National Defense University, 28 March 2011

The strategic command of Operation Odyssey Dawn was under the authority of General Carter Ham, the Combatant Commander of the United States Africa Command (AFRICOM), a Unified Combatant Command of the Department of Defense. Tactical command in the theater of operations was under command of Admiral Sam Locklear, the Commander of United States Naval Forces Africa on board the command ship USS Mount Whitney in the Mediterranean Sea. Vice Admiral Harry B. Harris, Commander, U.S. Sixth Fleet, assumed responsibilities as the Joint Forces Maritime Component Commander, also stationed aboard USS Mount Whitney along with Brigadier General Paul W. Brier, Commander, U.S. Marine Corps Forces Europe and Africa, as the Deputy Joint Forces Maritime Component Command. Major General Margaret H. Woodward was commander of US Air Force aircraft involved in the operation. On 21 March 2011, President Obama stated the U.S. military action would be scaled back soon and was considering handing over command of the operation to either France, the UK or NATO. On 24 March 2011, NATO took command of enforcing the no-fly zone in Libya and was considering taking control of the rest of the mission. On 24 March 2011, the coalition agreed to have NATO command the no-fly zone, and the U.S. Department of Defense stated that the U.S. would relinquish command of Operation Odyssey Dawn as early as 28 March.

== Deployed forces ==
- Belgian Armed Forces
  - Belgian Air Component
    - Six F-16AM 15MLU Falcon fighter jets operating from Araxos Air Base, Greece
- Canadian Armed Forces
  - Royal Canadian Air Force
    - Total 440 military personnel deployed
    - Seven CF-18 Hornet fighter jets operating from Trapani-Birgi Airport, Italy
    - Two Airbus CC-150 Polaris air-to-air refueling tankers operating from Trapani-Birgi Airport, Italy
    - Two Lockheed CP-140 Aurora maritime patrol aircraft operating from Naval Air Station Sigonella, Sicily, Italy
    - Two CC-177 Globemaster III heavy transports
    - Two CC-130J Super Hercules tactical transports
  - Royal Canadian Navy
    - Frigate HMCS Charlottetown
  - JTF2
    - There are reports of members of JTF2 working with Britain's SAS and SBS on the ground in Libya.
- Danish Armed Forces
  - Royal Danish Air Force
    - Six F-16AM 15MLU Falcon fighter jets operating from Sigonella Air Base, Italy
    - One C-130J-30 military transport aircraft
- Italian Armed Forces
  - Italian Air Force
    - Four Tornado ECR SEAD planes operating from Trapani Air Base
    - Four Tornado IDS planes operating from Trapani Air Base
    - Four F-16A 15ADF Falcon fighter as escort operating from Trapani Air Base
    - Six EF2000 Typhoon fighter as air defence interceptor operating from Trapani Air Base (supporting the Italian contribution, but not under direct U.S. Command)
    - Four AMX in the attack/reconnaissance role operating from Trapani Air Base
    - Four AV8B Plus in the attack/air defence role operating from the Italian Navy aircraft carrier Giuseppe Garibaldi
    - Two MQ-9 drones operating from Foggia-Amendola Air Base
    - One G222VS in the electronic warfare (supporting the Italian contribution, but not under direct U.S. Command)
    - One KC-767A in the air-to-air- refueling operating from Trapani Air Base (supporting the Italian contribution, but not under direct U.S. Command)
- Netherlands Armed Forces
  - Royal Netherlands Air Force
    - Six F-16AM 15MLU Falcon fighter jets operating from Decimomannu Air Base, Italy
    - One KDC-10 Tanker Aircraft
- Norwegian Armed Forces
  - Royal Norwegian Air Force
    - Six F-16AM 15MLU Falcon fighter jets operating from Souda Air Base, Crete
    - Two C-130J-30 military transport aircraft supporting the Norwegian forces.
- Qatar Armed Forces
  - Qatar Air Force
    - Six Mirage 2000-5EDA fighters jets operating from Souda Air Base, Crete
    - Two C-17 Globemaster III strategic transport aircraft
- Spanish Armed Forces
  - Spanish Air Force
    - Four EF-18AM Hornet fighters jets operating from Decimomannu Air Base, Italy
    - One Boeing 707-331B(KC) tanker aircraft
    - One CN-235 maritime patrol aircraft
  - Spanish Navy
    - AEGIS air defence frigate F-104 Méndez Núñez
    - Attack submarine S-74 Tramontana
- Union Defence Force
  - United Arab Emirates Air Force
    - Six F-16E/F Block 60 Falcon fighter jets operating from Decimomannu Air Base, Italy
    - Six Dassault Mirage 2000 fighter jets operating from Decimomannu Air Base, Italy
- United States Armed Forces
  - United States Navy
    - USS Mount Whitney, the command ship of the United States Sixth Fleet
      - The Kearsarge Amphibious Ready Group, consisting of:
        - USS Kearsarge, a Wasp-class amphibious assault ship
        - USS Ponce, an Austin-class amphibious transport dock
        - USS Carter Hall, a Harpers Ferry-class dock landing ship
        - embarked 26th Marine Expeditionary Unit
      - USS Barry, an Arleigh Burke-class guided missile destroyer
      - USS Stout, another Arleigh Burke-class guided missile destroyer
      - USS Providence, a Los Angeles-class nuclear attack submarine (Note: USS Providence left the area some time around 27–28 March.)
      - USS Scranton, a second Los Angeles-class nuclear attack submarine
      - USS Florida, an Ohio-class cruise missile submarine
      - USNS Kanawha, a Henry J. Kaiser-class oiler
      - USNS Lewis and Clark, a Lewis and Clark-class dry cargo ship
      - USNS Robert E. Peary, a Lewis and Clark-class dry cargo ship
    - Five EA-18G Growler electronic warfare aircraft operating out of NAS Sigonella and Aviano Air Base
    - One EP-3E ELINT aircraft
    - Two P-3C Update 3 maritime surveillance aircraft
    - Two P-3C AIP maritime surveillance aircraft
  - United States Air Force
    - Three B-2 Spirit stealth bombers operating from Whiteman AFB.
    - Two B-1B bombers
    - Ten F-15E Strike Eagle strike fighters operating out of Aviano Air Base, Italy
    - Eight F-16C Fighting Falcon multi-role fighters from Spangdahlem Air Base started leaving for Aviano on 20 March
    - Twelve F-16C Fighting Falcon multi-role fighters from Aviano Air Base
    - Two HH-60 Pave Hawk combat search and rescue helicopters from RAF Lakenheath operating from USS Ponce.
    - Three E-3 Sentry airborne warning and control system (AWACS)
    - Three E-8C battle management/command and control aircraft
    - One EC-130H electronic warfare (communications jamming) aircraft
    - One EC-130J psychological operations aircraft
    - One RC-135V/W Rivet Joint signals intelligence aircraft
    - Two AC-130U gunships
    - Four KC-10A Extender Aerial Refueling Tanker/Airlift Aircraft
    - Twenty KC-135 Stratotanker Aerial Refueling Tanker Aircraft
    - Six A-10 Thunderbolt ground-attack aircraft
    - Global Hawk unmanned aerial surveillance vehicle
    - Lockheed U-2 Reconnaissance aircraft
    - Predator/Reaper UAV
  - United States Marine Corps
    - Four AV-8B Harrier II ground attack fighters from the 26th Marine Expeditionary Unit, operating off of USS Kearsarge
    - Over 400 Marines of 2nd Battalion 2nd Marines from Camp Lejeune, North Carolina deployed as the Air Contingency Battalion (ACB), on 1 March 2011 to serve as the new Battalion Landing Team for the 26th MEU. The ACB was attached to the 26th MEU on 5 March 2011 at NAS Souda Bay. This was the first time ACB had been used in almost a decade.
    - Two MV-22 Osprey tiltrotor aircraft from the 26th MEU participated in the pilot rescue.
    - Two CH-53E Super Stallions from the 26th MEU participated in the pilot rescue.
    - One KC-130J Hercules from the 26th MEU participated in the pilot rescue.
  - Central Intelligence Agency
    - CIA Operatives gathering military and political information
  - Defense Intelligence Agency
    - DIA Operatives gathering military information

== Summary of action ==
EC-130J transmission
"Libyan ship or vessel, remain anchored. Do not leave port. The Gaddafi regime forces are violating a United Nations resolution ordering the end of hostilities in your country. If you attempt to leave port, you will be attacked and destroyed immediately. For your own safety, do not leave port."

=== 19 March ===
21h: The first main strike involved the launch of 112 Tomahawk cruise missiles from U.S. and UK ships against shoreline air defenses of the Gaddafi regime. The U.S. Department of Defense reports that the dismantling of Libya's ability to hinder the enforcement of the UN no-fly zone was only the first of multiple stages in the operation. USMC Harriers participated in an air strike against a large military convoy outside Benghazi.

=== 20 March ===
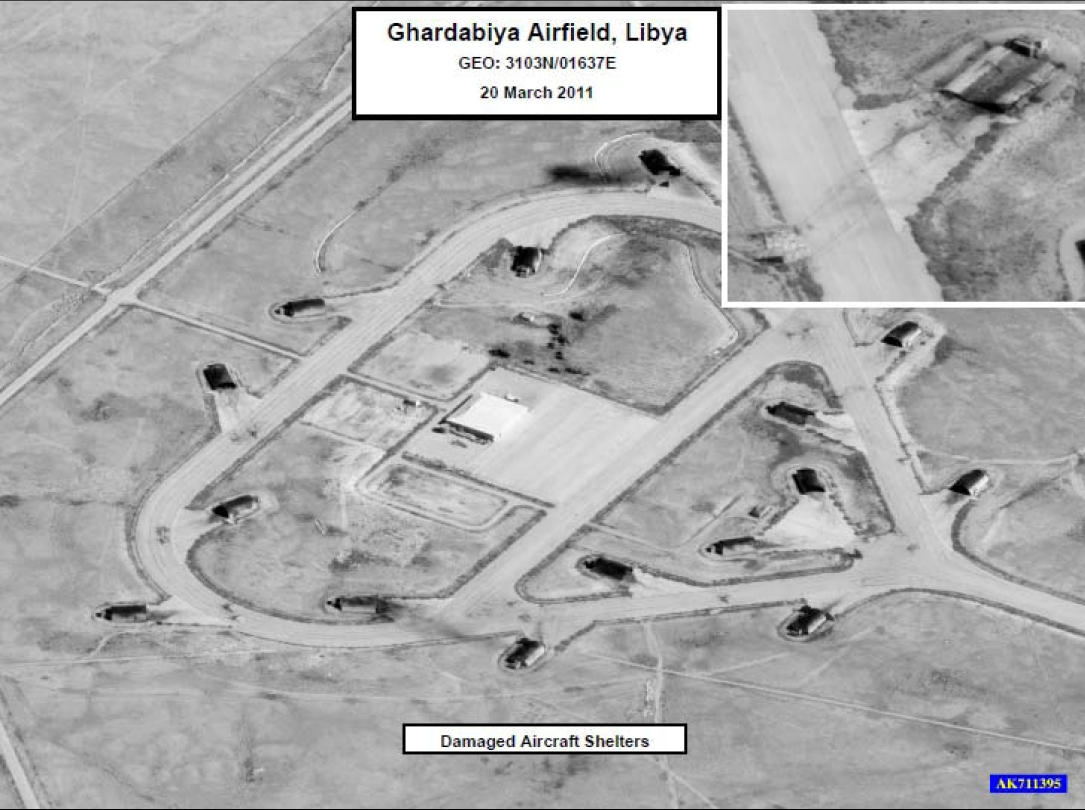
Damage to aircraft shelters at Ghardabiya Airbase near Sirte, 20 March

Sustained anti-aircraft fire erupted in Tripoli at around 02:33 EET. Three B-2 Spirit bombers targeted 45 hardened aircraft shelters at a Libyan airfield near Sirte. At the same time, U.S. Air Force fighter jets conducted missions searching for Libyan ground forces to attack. U.S. Navy EA-18G Growlers jammed Libyan radar and communications. No U.S. aircraft were lost during the missions. The warplanes included Marine Corps AV-8B Harrier IIs (attacking pro-Gaddafi's ground forces), Air Force B-2 Spirit stealth bombers, and F-15E Strike Eagle and F-16C Fighting Falcon fighter jets. Admiral Mike Mullen, Chairman of the Joint Chiefs of Staff, states that there would be continuous allied air cover over Benghazi, and that the no-fly zone "is effectively in place". An EC-130J was recorded warning Libyan shipping "If you attempt to leave port, you will be attacked and destroyed immediately" in Arabic, French and English. Four Royal Danish Air Force F-16 flew their first mission over Libya

=== 21 March ===
All fixed SA-2 Guideline, SA-3 Goa and SA-5 Gammon sites were taken out. Only SA-6 Gainful, hand held SA-7 Grail and SA-8 Gecko mobile SAMs were still a possible threat to aircraft. In the early hours of the day a building from Moammar Gadhafi's compound in Tripoli was completely destroyed by a cruise missile. Twelve more cruise missiles were fired at command and air defense sites.

=== 22 March ===
At approximately 22:30 CET (evening of 21 March), a USAFE F-15E 91-0304 operating out of RAF Lakenheath (TDY to Aviano Air Base) crashed about 25 miles (40 km) southwest of Benghazi. Both crew members ejected at high altitude and were subsequently separated. A MV-22 Osprey, supported by two AV-8Bs, two CH-53E Super Stallions, and a KC-130J Hercules from the 26th MEU initially recovered the pilot, while the weapons officer was recovered later after being rescued by rebel forces in the area. Two Marine Harriers accompanying the rescue force dropped two 500 lb bombs at the request of the ejected pilot, prior to the MV-22 landing in an attempt to deter an unidentified group of people heading towards the area. The UK had a "peripheral involvement" in the rescue of the U.S. pilots.

Six local villagers, including a young boy, were reported to have been injured by gunfire from the rescuing U.S. forces, A Marine spokesperson aboard USS Kearsarge denied that shots were fired, saying: "The Osprey is not armed, and the Marines barely got off the aircraft. I was in the landing center the whole time, where we were monitoring what was going on, and firing was never reported", Pentagon sources were later reported to have confirmed that shots were fired, but the source of the civilian casualties is still being investigated.

Overnight, the U.S. bombed the wreckage of the downed F-15E "to prevent materials from getting into the wrong hands."

In a 24-hours period; 175 air sorties were conducted (113 US, 62 coalition). Around this time, the U.S. changed its target priorities from air defenses to Libyan ground forces.

=== 24 March ===
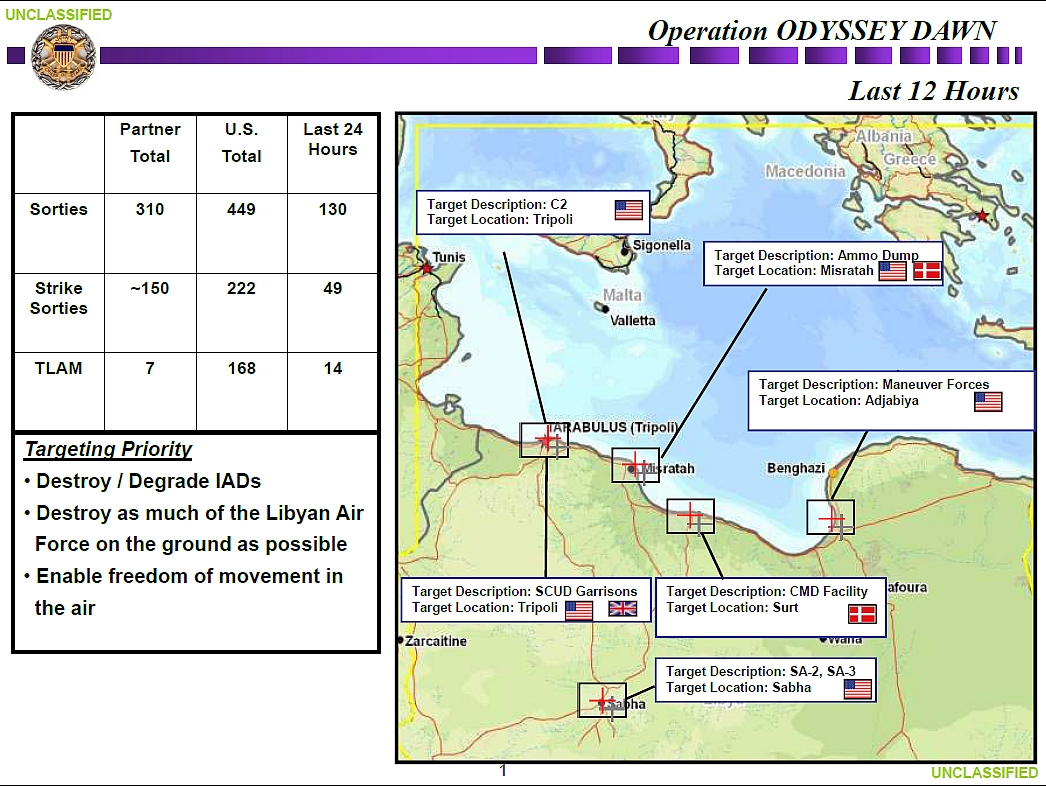
24 March

Royal Norwegian Air Force F-16s were assigned to the U.S. African Command and Operation Odyssey Dawn. A number of Norwegian F-16s took off from the Souda Bay Air Base on the island of Crete, Greece for their first mission over Libya.

=== 25 March ===
Three laser-guided bombs were launched from 2 F-16s of the Royal Norwegian Air Force against Libyan tanks. F-16s from the Royal Norwegian Air Force bombed an airfield in Libya during the night. Coalition planes flew 164 sorties and coalition leaders reported damage to Gadhafi's ground forces.

=== 26 & 27 March ===
Lockheed AC-130 gunships and Fairchild Republic A-10 Thunderbolt II ground attack aircraft began operations, attacking ground forces. These were the first aircraft used against troops; previous strikes had targeted command and anti-aircraft infrastructure. Two B-1 bombers from Ellsworth Air Force Base attacked undisclosed targets in Libya.

Attack submarine USS Providence completed all assigned strike missions and left the area to return to its previous duties.

At this point in the mission, the U.S. was responsible for 80% of air refueling, 75% of aerial surveillance hours and 100% of electronic warfare missions.

=== 28 & 29 March ===
On 28 March, a USAF A-10 and a USN P-3 attacked a Libyan Coast Guard vessel and two smaller craft after U.S. forces observed them firing into Misurata and at merchant vessels. The P-3 fired AGM-65F Maverick missiles at the patrol boat Vittoria, forcing the crew to beach her. The A-10 strafed the other two smaller boats with its 30mm GAU-8 Avenger cannon rounds, sinking one and forcing the crew to abandon the other. The USS Barry provided situational awareness for the aircraft by managing the airspace and maintaining the maritime picture.

=== 31 March ===
From 08:00 EET, NATO took sole command of air operations over Libya under Operation Unified Protector, taking over from U.S. Africa Command. The four Danish F-16 fighters flew a total of 43 missions and dropped 107 precision munitions in operation Odyssey Dawn before transiting to NATO command.

== Criticism ==
There has been criticism over the handling of the operation and the belief that the Obama administration failed to adequately consult the U.S. Congress. The Obama administration defended its handling of the Libyan crisis, drawing a clear line between military and political objectives. On 24 March White House Press Secretary Jay Carney told reporters "We are not engaged in militarily-driven regime change." Instead, the administration is engaged in "time-limited, scope-limited" action with other countries to protect civilians from forces loyal to Muammar Gaddafi. However, this conflicts with multiple statements seeming to imply regime change as at least one objective of the Operation, including a report made to Congress as required by House Resolution 292:

Establishing these conditions would pave the way for a genuine political transition – of which Qadhafi's departure is a critical component. To bring about this objective, along with the international community, the United States responded to this crisis by developing, implementing, and monitoring sanctions and freezing billions in Government of Libya assets, building a broad international coalition focused on escalating diplomatic pressure on Qadhafi and increasing his isolation, and initiating and sustaining political support for military operations. ... Politically, U.S. leadership continues to play an important role in maintaining and expanding this international consensus that Qadhafi must step down, sending an unambiguous message to the regime. We continue working with the international community to enhance the capabilities of the Libyan opposition and increase the ability to achieve political transition. After many meetings with senior opposition members in Washington and abroad, combined with daily interactions with the U.S. mission in Benghazi, we have stated that the TNC has demonstrated itself to be the legitimate interlocutor of the Libyan people, in contrast to the Qadhafi regime that has lost all legitimacy to rule.

== See also ==
- Operation El Dorado Canyon – 1986 U.S. air-strikes against Libya
- Operation Unified Protector – NATO operation for enforcement of UNSCR 1970 and 1973

== Footnotes ==
Notes
