= Operation Unified Protector =

2011 NATO operation in Libya during the civil war

- Part of the 2011 military intervention in Libya
- NATO Unified Protector logo
Date	23 March – 31 October 2011 (7 months, 1 week and 1 day)
Location	Libyan airspace and Mediterranean Sea off the coast of Libya
Result	NATO victory: No-fly zone established over Libya; Sanctions imposed on Gaddafi regime; Overthrow of Gaddafi regime

Belligerents
NATO-led coalition List: Belgium; Bulgaria; Canada; Denmark; France; Greece; Italy; Jordan; Netherlands; Norway; Qatar; Romania; Spain; Sweden; Turkey; United Arab Emirates; United Kingdom; United States	Libyan Arab Jamahiriya

Commanders and leaders
(United States) James G. Stavridis (SACEUR) (Canada) Charles Bouchard (Operational Commander) (United States) Ralph Jodice (Air Commander) (Italy) Rinaldo Veri (Maritime Commander)	(Libya) Muammar Gaddafi (executed) (De facto Commander-in-Chief) (Libya) Abu-Bakr Yunis Jabr X (Minister of Defense) (Libya) Khamis al-Gaddafi † (Khamis Brigade Commander) (Libya) Ali Sharif al-Rifi (Air Force Commander)

Strength
- See deployed forces

Operation Unified Protector was a NATO operation in 2011 enforcing United Nations Security Council resolutions 1970 and 1973 concerning the Libyan Civil War and adopted on 26 February and 17 March 2011, respectively. These resolutions imposed sanctions on key members of the Gaddafi government and authorized NATO to implement an arms embargo, a no-fly zone and to use all means necessary, short of foreign occupation, to protect Libyan civilians and civilian populated areas.

The operation started on 23 March 2011 and gradually expanded during the following weeks, by integrating more and more elements of the multinational military intervention, which had started on 19 March in response to the same UN resolutions. As of 31 March 2011 it encompassed all international operations in Libya. NATO support was vital to the rebel victory over the forces loyal to Gaddafi. The operation officially ended on 31 October 2011, after the rebel leaders, formalized in the National Transitional Council, had declared Libya liberated on 23 October.

The operation began with a naval arms embargo, while command of the no-fly zone and the air strikes against Libyan Armed Forces remained under command of the international coalition, led by France, the United Kingdom and the United States, due to lack of consensus between NATO members. On 24 March NATO decided to take control of the no-fly zone enforcement, by integrating the air assets of the international coalition under NATO command, although the command of air strikes on ground targets remained under national authority. A few days later, on 27 March NATO decided to implement all military aspects of the UN resolution and formal transfer of command occurred at 06:00 GMT on 31 March 2011, formally ending the national operations such as the U.S.-coordinated Operation Odyssey Dawn.

The arms embargo was initially carried out using mainly ships from NATO's Standing Maritime Group 1 and Standing Mine Countermeasures Group 1 already patrolling the Mediterranean Sea at the time of the resolution, enforced with additional ships, submarines and maritime surveillance aircraft from NATO members. They were to "monitor, report and, if needed, interdict vessels suspected of carrying illegal arms or mercenaries". The no-fly zone was enforced by aircraft transferred to Unified Protector from the international coalition, with additional aircraft from NATO and other allied nations. The air strikes, although under central NATO command, were only conducted by aircraft of the nations agreeing to enforce this part of the UN resolution.

== Background ==
=== Libyan conflict ===
With Operation Unified Protector, NATO is involved in an internal Libyan conflict, between those seeking to depose the country's long-time national leader Muammar Gaddafi and pro-Gaddafi forces. The conflict began as a series of non-peaceful disorders, part of the broader Arab Spring movement, which Gaddafi's security services attempted to repress, but which soon developed into a widespread uprising.

The situation further escalated into armed conflict, with rebels establishing a provisional government named the National Transitional Council based in eastern city of Benghazi and controlling the eastern part of the country and the western city of Misrata. The International Criminal Court warned Gaddafi that he and members of his government may have committed crimes against humanity. The United Nations Security Council passed an initial resolution 1970, freezing the assets of Gaddafi and ten members of his inner circle, and restricting their travel. The resolution also referred the actions of the government to the International Criminal Court for investigation.

In early March, Gaddafi's forces rallied, pushed eastwards and re-took several coastal cities and finally began attacking the rebel stronghold of Benghazi on 19 March 2011. Two days earlier a second U.N. resolution, UNSC Resolution 1973, was passed which authorized member states to establish and enforce an arms embargo, a no-fly zone over Libya and to use all means necessary, short of foreign occupation, to protect Libyan civilians. In response to the resolution, the Gaddafi government announced a ceasefire, but failed to uphold it and continued to advance on the rebels and the Second Battle of Benghazi began.

=== International intervention ===
In response to the U.N. resolution, voted on 17 March 2011, an international coalition was established and naval and air forces were quickly deployed in and around the Mediterranean Sea. Two days later, on 19 March, France intervened in the imminent Second Battle of Benghazi with air strikes on Gaddafi armor and troops and eventually forced them back. On the same day 110 Tomahawk cruise missiles were launched from UK and US ships, further air strikes against ground targets were executed and a naval blockade was established. The initial coalition consisted of Belgium, Canada, Denmark, France, Italy, Norway, Qatar, Spain, the United Kingdom and the United States. The official names for the interventions by the coalition members are Opération Harmattan by France; Operation Ellamy by the United Kingdom; Operation Mobile for the Canadian participation and Operation Odyssey Dawn for the United States.

The U.S. initially coordinated the effort and took strategic and tactical command at UCC USAFRICOM, led by Carter Ham, and the Joint Task Force Odyssey Dawn, led by Samuel J. Locklear aboard the command ship USS Mount Whitney (LCC-20), respectively. From there on command was split between the air and naval components of the operation at which level the different participating countries commanded their assets in accordance with their rules of engagement and through liaison officers.

After the initial intervention, the U.S. wanted to scale down their involvement significantly to a supporting role. Due to lack of consensus within NATO, the only other body capable of commanding a multinational operation of this size, however, this was not possible immediately. As consensus grew during the next days, NATO took more and more parts of the operation under its command until taking command of all military operations on 31 March.

== Command structure ==
Political direction is provided by the North Atlantic Council to the Supreme Headquarters Allied Powers Europe. The chain of command is from Supreme Allied Commander Europe, Admiral James G. Stavridis (US Navy), to the Deputy Commander of Allied Joint Force Command Naples, Lt. General Charles Bouchard (Royal Canadian Air Force) acting as operational commander. From the operational level, command is further delegated to the Commander of Allied Maritime Command Naples, Vice Admiral Rinaldo Veri (Italian Navy) for the naval operations and Commander of Allied Air Command Izmir, Lieutenant General Ralph J. Jodice II (US Air Force) for air operations.

== Deployed forces ==
=== Allied Maritime Command ===
- (Belgium) Belgian Naval Component
  - Narcis, a Tripartite-class minehunter (Operational from 23 March 2011 until 24 July 2011)
  - Lobelia, a Tripartite-class minehunter (Operational from 12 August 2011)
- (Bulgaria) Bulgarian Navy
  - Drazki, a Wielingen-class frigate
- (Canada) Canadian Forces
  - Royal Canadian Navy
    - HMCS Charlottetown, a Halifax-class frigate (transferred from Operation MOBILE, operational until 18 August 2011)
    - HMCS Vancouver, a Halifax-class frigate (operational from 18 August 2011)
    - 1 × CH-124 Sea King anti-submarine helicopter
- French Navy (transferred from Opération Harmattan)
  - Landing helicopter dock Tonnerre (L9014)
    - 14 × Aérospatiale Gazelle
    - 4 × Eurocopter Tiger
    - 2 × Eurocopter Puma
  - 2 × Atlantique 2 signals intelligence aircraft based at Naval Air Station Sigonella in Sicily, Italy
  - Task Force 473
    - Aircraft carrier Charles de Gaulle (R91)
      - 10 × Rafale M fighters
      - 6 × Super-Etendard strike aircraft
      - 2 × E-2C airborne early warning aircraft
      - 2 × Dauphin multipurpose helicopters
      - 2 × Alouette III utility helicopters
      - French Air Force detachment of a Puma and 2 × Caracal transport helicopters
    - Anti-air frigate Jean Bart (D615) (until 2 April 2011)
    - Frigate Dupleix (D641)
    - Frigate Aconit (F713)
    - Frigate Chevalier Paul (D621)
    - Frigate Georges Leygues (D640)
    - Frigate Courbet (F712) (Returned to France)
    - Replenishment tanker Meuse (A607)
    - Nuclear attack submarine Améthyste (S605)
- (Greece) Hellenic Navy
  - Limnos, an Elli-class frigate
- (Italy) Italian Navy
  - Giuseppe Garibaldi aircraft carrier
    - 8 × AV-8B Harrier II V/STOL ground-attack aircraft
    - 4 × AW101 Merlin anti-submarine warfare helicopters
    - Boarding teams from the San Marco Regiment
  - Andrea Doria, a Horizon-class destroyer
  - Libeccio, a Maestrale-class frigate
  - Etna, an Etna-class auxiliary ship
  - Comandante Borsini and Comandante Bettica, two Comandanti-class patrol vessels
- Royal Netherlands Navy
  - HNLMS Haarlem, an Alkmaar-class minehunter until 23 September
  - HNLMS Vlaardingen, an Alkmaar-class minehunter
- (Romania) Romanian Navy
  - Regele Ferdinand, a Type 22 frigate
- (Spain) Spanish Armed Forces
  - Spanish Navy
    - Méndez Núñez, an Álvaro de Bazán-class frigate
    - Tramontana, an Agosta-class submarine
- (Turkey) Turkish Navy
  - TCG Zafer, a Tepe-class frigate
  - TCG Giresun, a G-class frigate
  - TCG Gemlik, a G-class frigate
  - TCG Yıldırım, a Yavuz-class frigate
  - TCG Yıldıray, a Type 209 submarine
  - TCG Akar, a fleet support ship
- (United Kingdom) Royal Navy
  - HMS Bangor (Sandown-class minehunter)
  - HMS Brocklesby (Hunt-class minesweeper)
  - HMS Ocean (Landing platform helicopter) (From 27 May 2011).
  - HMS Albion (Albion-class landing platform dock)
  - HMS Liverpool (Type 42 destroyer) (Replaced HMS Cumberland from 9 April)
  - HMS Sutherland (Type 23 frigate)
  - HMS Iron Duke (Type 23 frigate)
  - RFA Fort Rosalie (Stores ship)
  - RFA Wave Knight (Tanker)
  - HMS Triumph (Trafalgar-class submarine)
  - HMS Turbulent (Trafalgar-class submarine)
- United States Navy
  - USS Mount Whitney (Blue Ridge-class command ship)
  - USS Kearsarge (Wasp-class amphibious assault ship)
  - USS Bataan (Wasp-class amphibious assault ship)
  - USS Mesa Verde (San Antonio-class amphibious transport dock)
  - USS Whidbey Island (Whidbey Island-class dock landing ship)
  - USS Ponce (Austin-class amphibious transport dock)
  - USS Carter Hall (Harpers Ferry-class dock landing ship)
  - USS Barry (Arleigh Burke-class destroyer)
  - USS Stout (Arleigh Burke-class destroyer)
  - USS Mahan (Arleigh Burke-class destroyer)
  - USS Halyburton (Oliver Hazard Perry-class frigate)
  - USNS Kanawha (Henry J. Kaiser-class replenishment oiler)
  - USNS Lewis and Clark (Lewis and Clark-class dry cargo ship)
  - USNS Robert E. Peary (Lewis and Clark-class dry cargo ship)
  - USS Providence (Los Angeles-class submarine)
  - USS Scranton (Los Angeles-class submarine)
  - USS Florida (Ohio-class cruise missile submarine)
- United States Marine Corps
  - 22nd Marine Expeditionary Unit (Embarked aboard USS Bataan, Whidbey Island, and Mesa Verde)
    - Battalion Landing Team- 2nd Battalion, 2nd Marine Regiment
      - Company E (Mechanized Company, USS Whidbey Island)
        - 1st Platoon, Company C, 2nd Assault Amphibian Battalion (formerly 3d Plt, Company D) (Amphibious Assault Vehicle)
        - Tank Platoon, 2nd Tank Battalion (M1A1 Abrams Tanks)
      - Company F (Helo Company, USS Bataan)
      - Company G (Truck Company, USS Mesa Verde)
      - Battery L, 3rd Battalion, 10th Marine Regiment (155mm Artillery and 120mm Mortars)
      - LAR Platoon, 2nd Light Armored Reconnaissance Battalion (Light Armored Vehicles)
      - Recon Platoon, 2nd Reconnaissance Battalion
    - Combat Logistics Battalion 22
    - Marine Medium Tiltrotor Squadron 263 (VMM 263) (Reinforced) (MV-22B, CH-53E, AV-8B, AH-1W, UH-1N, KC-130J)
      - Det Marine Aviation Logistics Squadron 14
      - Det Marine Aviation Logistics Squadron 26
      - Det C Marine Aerial Refueler Squadron 252 (C-130)
      - Det A Marine Aerial Refueler Squadron 452 (C-130)
      - Det A Marine Aerial Refueler Squadron 352 (C-130)

=== Allied Air Command ===
- (Turkey) Turkish Air Force
  - 6 x F-16C/D Block 40 fighter aircraft operating from Naval Air Station Sigonella, Italy
  - 1 × KC-135R aerial refueling aircraft
- (Belgium) Belgian Air Component
  - 6 x F-16 AM 15MLU fighter aircraft operating from Araxos Air Base, Greece
- (Canada) Royal Canadian Air Force
  - 6 × CF-18 Hornet multirole fighter jets operating from Trapani Air Base, Italy
  - 2 × CC-17 Globemaster strategic transport aircraft
  - 2 × CC-130J Hercules tactical transport aircraft operating from Trapani Air Base, Italy
  - 2 × CC-150 Polaris air-to-air refueling tankers operating from Trapani Air Base, Italy
  - 2 × CP-140 Aurora maritime patrol aircraft operating from Sigonella Air Base, Italy
  - Joint Task Force 2 (Canadian Special Operations Forces Command)
- (Denmark) Royal Danish Air Force
  - 6 x F-16 AM 15MLU fighter jets operating from Sigonella Air Base, Italy
  - 1 x C-130J-30 tactical transport aircraft
- (France) French Air Force (transferred from Opération Harmattan)
  - 8 × Rafale fighters
  - 8 × Mirage 2000-5 fighters
  - 6 × Mirage 2000D fighter-bombers
  - 2 × Mirage F1CR reconnaissance aircraft
  - 6 × C135 aerial refueling aircraft
  - 1 x E-3F AWACS aircraft
  - 1 x C-160G SIGINT electronic surveillance aircraft
  - Commando Parachutiste de l'Air companies 20 and 30 forward deployed to Solenzara Air Base, Corsica
- (Greece) Hellenic Air Force
  - 4 x F-16 fighter jets
  - 1 x Embraer R-99 early warning and control aircraft
- (Italy) Italian Air Force
  - 4 x Tornado ECR SEAD aircraft operating from Trapani Air Base
  - 4 x F-16 fighter jets
  - 4 x Eurofighter Typhoon fighter jets operating from Trapani Air Base
  - 4 x Panavia Tornado IDS, operating from Trapani Air Base, began attacking military targets in Libya with Storm Shadow missiles and JDAM and Paveway smart bombs on 28 April
  - 4 x AMX Ghibli fighter jets operating since 25 July
  - 1 x G222 electronic warfare aircraft
  - 1 x KC-767 aerial refuelling aircraft
  - 2 x MQ-9 Reaper
- NATO
  - E-3 airborne early warning and control (AWACS) aircraft operating from Forward Operating Base Trapani
- Royal Netherlands Air Force
  - 6 × F-16 AM 15MLU multi-role fighter jets operating from Decimomannu Air Base, Italy
  - 1 × McDonnell Douglas KDC-10 aerial refuelling aircraft, until 4 April
- (Norway) Royal Norwegian Air Force
  - 6 x F-16 AM 15MLU fighter jets operating from Souda Air Base, Crete (until July 2011)
  - 2 x C-130J-30 tactical transport aircraft supporting the Norwegian forces. (until July 2011)
- Qatar Emiri Air Force
  - Six Mirage 2000-5EDA fighters jets operating from Souda Air Base, Crete
  - Two C-17 Globemaster III strategic transport aircraft
- (Spain) Spanish Air Force
  - 4 x EF-18AM Hornet fighters jets operating from Decimomannu Air Base, Italy.
  - 1 x KC-130H Hercules Tanker Aircraft operating from Decimomannu Air Base, Italy
  - 1 x Boeing 707-331B(KC) tanker aircraft*** 1 x CN-235 maritime patrol aircraft
- (Sweden) Royal Swedish Air Force
  - 5 (reduced from 8) JAS 39C Gripen fighter jets operating from Sigonella Air Base, Italy
  - 1 x Lockheed Tp-84T C-130 Hercules configured as aerial tanker
  - 1 x S 102B Korpen SIGINT aircraft based on Gulfstream IV business Jet
- United Arab Emirates Air Force
  - 6 x F-16 E/F Block 60 Falcon fighter jets operating from Decimomannu Air Base, Italy
  - 6 x Dassault Mirage 2000 fighter jets operating from Decimomannu Air Base, Italy
- (United Kingdom) Royal Air Force
  - 16 Panavia Tornado GR4A
  - 8 (originally 10) Eurofighter Typhoons operating from Gioia del Colle Air Base, Italy
  - 2 Vickers VC-10 tanker aircraft
  - 2 AgustaWestland Lynx HMA.8 from the Royal Navy (Fleet Air Arm)
  - 4 AgustaWestland Apache attached from the Army Air Corps
  - 3 Sentry AEW.1 surveillance aircraft
  - 1 Raytheon Sentinel R1 surveillance aircraft
- (Jordan) Royal Jordanian Air Force
  - 6 x F-16 MLU fighter jets operating from Aviano Air Base, Italy
- United States Air Force
  - 77th Expeditionary Fighter Squadron (Shaw AFB)
  - 313th Air Expeditionary Wing (Moron AB, Spain)
  - Included KC-10A, KC-135R, EC-130J Psychological Warfare aircraft, E-8, E-3, and U-2S reconnaissance aircraft, F-15 and F-16 fighter aircraft, and MQ-1 Predator(Operated by the USAF & RAF).
- United States Navy
  - US Navy P-3C aircraft operating from NAS Sigonella
- United States Marine Corps
  - Marine Tactical Electronic Warfare Squadron 1 (VMAQ-1) operating from Aviano Air Base, Italy

== Contributions and expenses by country ==
- USA: from 1 April to 22 August, the US flew 5,316 sorties over Libya, including 1,210 strike sorties, with munitions deployed 262 times. By 31 July, the US had spent US$896 million in the conflict.
- UK: By 12 July, the UK had spent about €136 million on operations in Libya.
- Denmark: Royal Danish Air Force F-16 fighters flew their first mission over Libya on 20 March and their last on 31 October 2011, a total of 600 sorties dropping 923 bombs, equaling 12,1% of the total number dropped during the conflict. By 31 October, Denmark had spent a total of 620 million DKK (approx. €77.5 million) on operations in Libya, of which 297 million DKK (approx. €37.1 million) would have been spent on training anyway.
- Norway: Royal Norwegian Air Force F-16 fighters flew daily missions, and as of the end of July 2011, when Norway ceased its participation in military operations, the Air Force had dropped 588 bombs during the conflict and flown 615 sorties (about 17% of the sorties to that point).
- Italy: by 31 October, the Italian Air Force had dropped 710 bombs including approximately 30 Storm Shadow missiles during the conflict.

== See also ==
- UNSMIL
