= Operation Ellamy =

2011 British Operation in Libya

- Part of 2011 military intervention in Libya
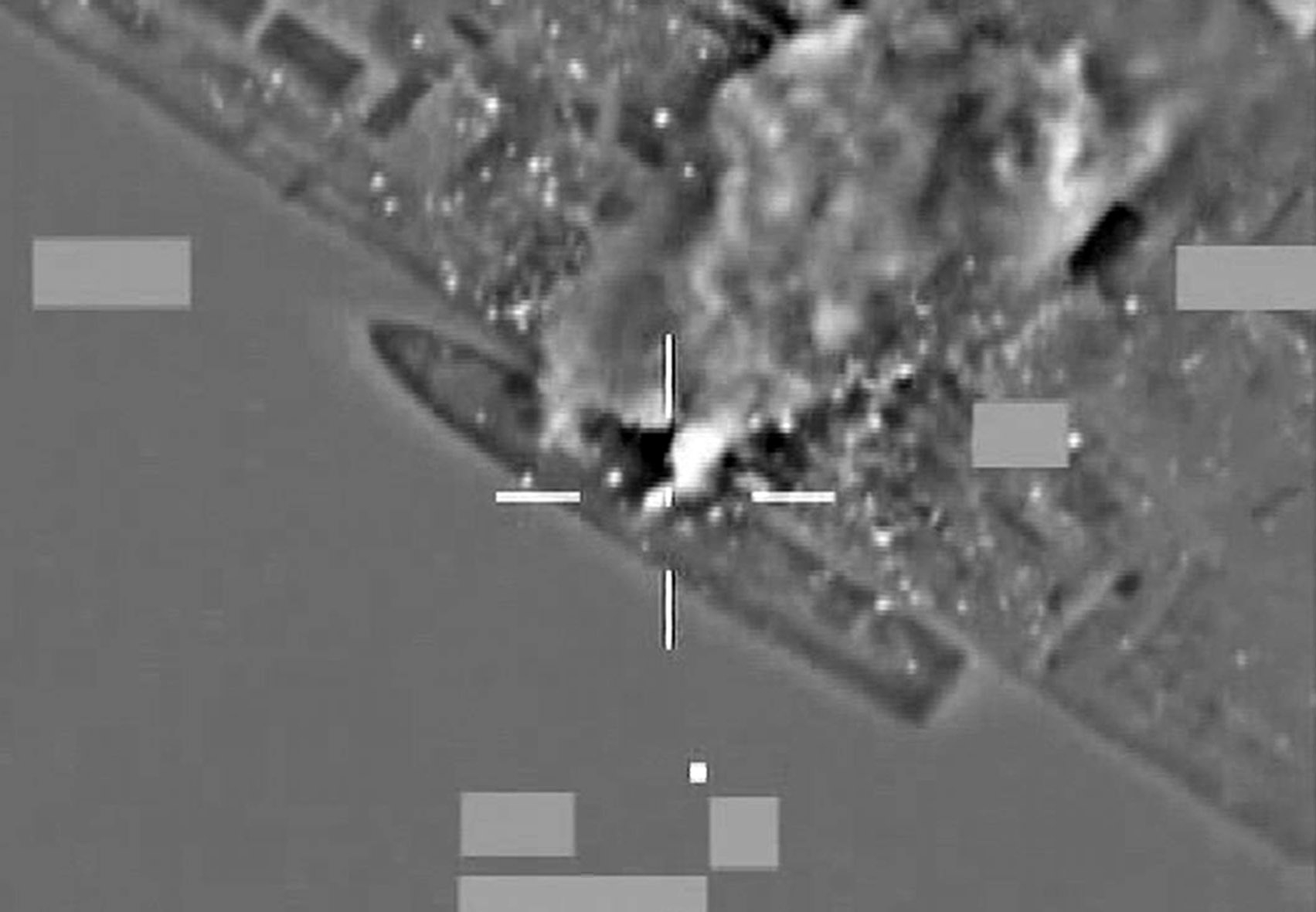
- RAF Tornado GR4 attacks a warship in Al Khums naval base, 20 May 2011
Date	19 March – 31 October 2011
Location	Libya
Result	British victory: Effective no-fly zone established.; Control handed over to NATO under Unified Protector.

Belligerents
United Kingdom	Libyan Arab Jamahiriya

Commanders and leaders
(United Kingdom) David Cameron; AM Sir Stuart Peach (CJO); Air Vice-Marshal Greg Bagwell (Air); Rear Admiral Ian Corder (Maritime)	(Libya) Muammar Gaddafi (executed) (De facto Commander-in-Chief) (Libya) Abu-Bakr Yunis Jabr X (Minister of Defence) (Libya) Khamis al-Gaddafi † (Khamis Brigade Commander) (Libya) Ali Sharif al-Rifi (Air Force Commander)

Strength
1 helicopter carrier 2 destroyers 3 frigates 2 mine hunters 2 submarines 10 multirole fighters 16 strike fighters 3 AWACS; 1 signals intelligence plane 4 attack helicopters	Unknown

Casualties and losses
None	200 tanks, armoured vehicles, artillery pieces, & SAMs destroyed (until 12 April); 1 corvette destroyed 1 corvette damaged

Operation Ellamy was the codename for the United Kingdom participation in the 2011 military intervention in Libya. The operation was part of an international coalition aimed at enforcing a Libyan no-fly zone in accordance with the United Nations Security Council Resolution 1973 which stipulated that "all necessary measures" shall be taken to protect civilians. The coalition operation was designated by NATO as Operation Unified Protector, by the US as Operation Odyssey Dawn. The Canadian participation as Operation Mobile and the French participation as Opération Harmattan. It was confirmed in December 2011 that the cost of the operations was £212m – less than was estimated, including £67m for replacing spent munitions, is all expected to be met from the Treasury reserve.

The no-fly zone was proposed during the Libyan Civil War to prevent government forces loyal to Muammar Gaddafi from carrying out air attacks on anti-Gaddafi forces. Several countries prepared to take immediate military action at a conference in Paris on 19 March 2011.

The randomly generated codename, "Ellamy," is an alternative spelling of the Early Modern English word, Elami (E-la-mi), a musical solmisation designating the note E in the context of a tetrachord. The spelling "Ellamy" is found in a poem frequently attributed to John Skelton, "The Harmony of Birds".

== Background to operation ==
The UN Security Council Resolution 1973 passed on the evening of 17 March 2011 gave a mandate to countries wishing to enforce a no-fly zone over Libya militarily. A conference involving international leaders took place in Paris on the afternoon of Saturday 19 March 2011. International military action commenced after the conference finished, with French military fighter jets being the first to participate in the operation only a few hours after the conference finished in Paris with the first shot fired at 1645 GMT against a Libyan tank.

== Deployed forces ==
- Royal Navy
  - HMS York (D98), a Type 42 destroyer
  - HMS Cumberland, a Type 22 frigate (Note: HMS Cumberland was diverted to participate in operations off Libya en route back to the UK from her final deployment)
  - HMS Sutherland, a Type 23 frigate
  - HMS Iron Duke, a Type 23 frigate
  - HMS Triumph, a Trafalgar-class submarine
  - HMS Turbulent, a Trafalgar-class submarine
  - HMS Liverpool, a Type 42 destroyer
  - HMS Bangor, Sandown-class minehunter in a maritime surveillance role
  - HMS Brocklesby (Hunt-class mine countermeasures vessel)
  - HMS Ocean
    - 2 x Lynx Mk 7 from Joint Helicopter Command
    - 2 x Sea King Mk 4 from Joint Helicopter Command
    - 1 x Lynx Mk 8 from 815 Naval Air Squadron
    - 2 x Sea King Mk 7 from 857 Naval Air Squadron
- Royal Air Force
  - Joint Force Air Component Headquarters at RAF Akrotiri
  - Headquarters 906 Expeditionary Air Wing at Gioia del Colle Air Base
    - 10 × Typhoon multirole fighters from RAF Coningsby and RAF Leuchars,
    - 16 × Tornado GR4 interdictor/strike aircraft from RAF Marham
  - Headquarters 907 Expeditionary Air Wing at RAF Akrotiri
    - 3 × Sentry AEW.1 AWACS aircraft from RAF Waddington
    - 1 x Nimrod R1 signals intelligence aircraft (Note: From Jane's Defence Weekly, 16 March 2011, operational requirements forced the Royal Air Force to deploy one of its two remaining Nimrod R1s two weeks before they were due to be withdrawn.)
    - 1 x Sentinel R1 airborne standoff radar aircraft from RAF Waddington
    - 2 × VC10 air-to-air refuelling tankers from RAF Brize Norton
  - Force Elements Operated from UK
    - Tornado GR4 interdictor/strike aircraft from RAF Marham
    - TriStar K1 & KC1 air-to-air refuelling tankers from RAF Brize Norton
- British Army
  - 4 x Apache AH1 (on board HMS Ocean).
  - 7 Signal Regiment Detachment
  - 22 Signal Regiment Detachment
- Elements of United Kingdom Special Forces

== Summary of operation ==
Day 1 – 19 March 2011

On the afternoon of the 19 March, the Royal Navy Trafalgar-class submarine HMS Triumph fired Tomahawk cruise missiles. Alongside the US a reported combined total of 110 cruise missiles were fired during the first day of operations.

The Royal Navy also had a Type 22 frigate (HMS Cumberland) and a Type 23 frigate (HMS Westminster) engaged in a naval blockade.

David Cameron, Prime Minister of the United Kingdom, confirmed that British aircraft were in action over Libya on the 19 March, although it was the French Air Force who made the first coalition aerial presence over Libya earlier the same day.

E3D Sentry, Sentinel and VC-10 aircraft were said to be carrying out operations from RAF Akrotiri in Cyprus.

On the night of the 19–20 March 2011, Storm Shadow missiles were launched by Tornado GR4 aircraft of No. 13 Squadron from RAF Marham, flying 3,000 mi (4,800 km) against targets in Libya. They required refuelling by British air to air refuelling aircraft three times en route to their targets and once on their return.

Day 2 – 20 March 2011

The Ministry of Defence (MoD) announced that Tornado and Typhoon fighters would be deployed to Italy at Gioia del Colle Air Base.

Meanwhile, the submarine HMS Triumph launched further Tomahawk cruise missiles at targets in Libya.

Tornados GR4s, flying from RAF Marham, aborted their mission, due to information being received, that suggested civilians were in the target areas. The Tornado aircraft returned to RAF Marham fully armed.

Day 3 – 21 March 2011

The Prime Minister announced to the House of Commons on the 21 March at the start of a debate on the United Nations Security Council resolution that RAF Typhoons had been deployed to an Italian airbase (Gioia del Colle) and would fly in support of the No-Fly Zone. Three Typhoons successfully conducted a mission and returned to Gioia del Colle.

906 Expeditionary Air Wing formed at Gioia del Colle Air Base and were responsible for assets forward deployed there. 907 Expeditionary Air Wing formed at RAF Akrotiri responsible for assets forward deployed there. C-17A Globemaster and Hercules transport aircraft were also used to assist in the buildup of deployed forces.

Day 4 – 22 March 2011

RAF Typhoons flew their first ever combat mission, patrolling the no-fly zone while Tornado GR4s from RAF Marham flew an armed reconnaissance mission. The MoD reported that Royal Navy ships Triumph, Westminster and Cumberland remained in theatre for additional strikes and maritime patrol.

Day 5 – 23 March 2011

Tornado GR4s forward deployed to Gioia del Colle Air Base. In a media interview, the UK Air Component Commander, Air Vice-Marshal Greg Bagwell, stated that the Libyan Air Force "no longer exists as a fighting force" and that "we have the Libyan ground forces under constant observation and we attack them whenever they threaten civilians or attack population centres."

Day 6 – 24 March 2011

HMS Triumph fired Tomahawk cruise missiles at targets in Libya. RAF Tornado aircraft on an armed reconnaissance mission fired Brimstone missiles against Libyan armoured vehicles that were reported to be threatening the civilian population of Ajdabiya. Four T-72 tanks were destroyed in the attack by RAF Tornados, and three by another coalition aircraft. Likely target locations had previously been identified by other Tornado aircraft equipped with RAPTOR pods.

Day 7 – 25 March 2011

RAF Tornado aircraft carried out Brimstone missile strikes, destroying three armoured vehicles in Misrata and two further armoured vehicles in Ajdabiya.

Day 9 – 27 March 2011

RAF Tornados from Gioia del Colle launched numerous armed reconnaissance missions, during the course of which ordnance released hit a total of 22 tanks, armoured vehicles and artillery pieces in the vicinity of Ajdabiya and Misrata.

Day 10 – 28 March 2011

Tornados from RAF Marham, supported by Tristar tanker aircraft from RAF Brize Norton, carried out Storm Shadow strikes against ammunition bunkers in the Sabha area in the southern Libyan desert. The bunkers were reportedly used to resupply Libyan Government troops attacking civilians in the north of the country.

The Type 42 destroyer HMS Liverpool was deployed to the Mediterranean to relieve the Type 22 frigate Cumberland.

Day 11 – 29 March 2011

The London Conference on Libya was chaired by the Foreign Secretary, William Hague.

Two RAF Tornados flying from Gioia del Colle engaged a Libyan armoured fighting vehicle and two artillery pieces with Brimstone missiles near Misrata.

Day 12 – 30 March 2011

RAF Tornados flying from Gioia del Colle engaged three Libyan tanks, two armoured fighting vehicles and a surface-to-air missile site with Brimstone missiles and Paveway IV bombs in the vicinity of Misrata. HMS Liverpool was deployed to relieve HMS Cumberland.

Day 13 – 31 March 2011

From 06:00 GMT, NATO took sole command of air operations over Libya under Operation Unified Protector, taking over from US Africa Command.

Day 15 – 2 April 2011

HMS Triumph returned to base HMNB Devonport flying the Jolly Roger marking six successful Tomahawk launches.

RAF Tornado aircraft launched Paveway IV bombs against pro-Gaddafi forces. Two main battle tanks in Sirte and several small ground-attack aircraft at an airfield near Misrata were reportedly hit.

Day 16 – 3 April 2011

RAF Tornados reportedly launched successful attacks with Paveway IV and Brimstone missiles against ten armoured fighting vehicles south of Sirte.

Day 17 – 4 April 2011

The number of Tornado aircraft taking part in Operation Ellamy was increased from eight to twelve on 4 April, with the aircraft deploying from RAF Marham. RAF Tornados, engaged in two separate strikes in the Libyan city of Sirte, launched three Brimstone missiles which destroyed one main battle tank and two surface-to-air missile launchers.

Day 22 – 9 April 2011

Seven tanks were destroyed by RAF Tornado aircraft, two in Ajdabiya and five in Misrata, using Paveway IV bombs and Brimstone missiles.

Day 23 – 10 April 2011

The MoD reported that over the weekend of 22–23 April, of a total of 61 armoured vehicles and air defence assets destroyed by NATO, 21 were destroyed by RAF aircraft.

Day 25 – 12 April 2011

HMS Turbulent was declared available in theatre by the MoD for Tomahawk strikes should they be required.

RAF Typhoon aircraft were used operationally in a ground attack role for the first time. A Typhoon destroyed two main battle tanks near Misrata with Paveway II whilst a Tornado destroyed the third with Paveway IV. In total, RAF aircraft destroyed eight main battle tanks on 12 April. From the start of Operation Ellamy up until 12 April, RAF aircraft had engaged over 100 main battle tanks, artillery pieces, armoured vehicles and SAMs.

Day 31–18 April 2011

RAF Tornados and Typhoons attacked a pair of multiple rocket launcher vehicles and a light artillery piece reportedly firing on Misrata, as well as a self-propelled gun and tank.

HMS Triumph was reported by the MoD to have launched two salvoes of Tomahawk missiles against command and control facilities, alongside precision strikes by RAF Tornados, Typhoons and coalition aircraft.

HMS Liverpool intercepted the vessel MV Setubal Express heading for Tripoli, conducting a boarding party search with Royal Marines and finding trucks potentially of use to the Gaddafi regime. The merchant vessel was ordered to divert to Salerno in Italy.

Day 32 – 19 April 2011

The Foreign Secretary announced that a British Military Liaison Advisory Team would to be sent to Benghazi to advise the NTC on how to improve their military organisational structures, communications and logistics.

Day 43 – 30 April 2011

HMS Brocklesby destroyed a buoyant mine containing over 100 kg (220 lb) of high explosive. Using her sonar and underwater mine disposal system, Seafox, the mine was destroyed 1 mile (1.6 km) from the entrance to Misrata harbour, making the waters safe for aid ships to enter.

Day 49 – 6 May 2011

RAF Tornados attacked a site south of Sirte based on analysis of intelligence by RAF Tactical Imagery Wing. 20 FROG-7 launchers and a significant number of Scud canisters were reported as either completely or partially destroyed. RAF aircraft also destroyed one tank and two armoured vehicles in the area of Misrata and one mobile rocket launcher south of Tripoli.

Day 55 – 12 May 2011

An RAF Typhoon was reported to have destroyed two Palmaria 155 mm howitzers near Sirte.

While engaged in surveillance operations off the coast of the rebel-held Libyan city of Misrata, HMS Liverpool came under fire from a shore battery, making her the first Royal Navy warship to be deliberately targeted since the Falklands War. HMS Liverpool had been tasked with other NATO warships, to intercept small, high-speed inflatable craft spotted approaching the port of Misrata, the type which had been used previously to lay mines in the entrance of the port. Libyan rocket artillery on the coast fired an inaccurate salvo of rockets at the ship. HMS Liverpool returned fire with her 4.5-inch main gun, silencing the shore battery, in the Royal Navy's first use of the weapon since the 2003 invasion of Iraq.

Day 59 – 16 May 2011

Royal Navy Tomahawk missiles reportedly fired from HMS Triumph, and Paveway IV bombs released by RAF Tornado aircraft were reported to have struck intelligence agency buildings and a training base used by Colonel Gaddafi's Executive Protection Force. RN and RAF attacks were reported to have damaged or destroyed over 300 targets since the start of Operation Ellamy.

Day 62 – 19/20 May 2011

RAF Tornado GR4s hit two Nanuchka-class corvettes in Al Khums naval base and destroyed a facility in the dockyard constructing fast inflatable boats which Libyan forces had reportedly used to mine Misrata and attack vessels in the area.

Day 63 – 20 May 2011

RAF aircraft destroyed five multiple rockets launchers around Tripoli.

Day 67 – 24 May 2011

RAF aircraft attacked four armoured vehicles deployed near the Libyan city of Zlitan. An RAF Tornado attacked a Libyan coastal radar station near Brega, which was destroyed with a dual-mode seeker Brimstone missile.

Day 68 – 25 May 2011

A vehicle depot at Tiji was attacked by a Typhoon FGR4 and a Tornado GR4 dropping four Enhanced Paveway II and five Paveway IV weapons between them.

Day 70 – 27 May 2011

HMS Ocean (detached from the Response Force Task Group COUGAR 11 deployment) deployed with a complement of four Apache helicopters to aid operations along with Sea King Mk7 ASaC helicopters which begin flying surveillance and reconnaissance sorties of Libyan coast, Misrata, Sirte, and Benghazi.

Day 77 – 3 June 2011

Five ships from The Response Force Task Group were temporarily deployed from COUGAR 11 (an RFTG ship, HMS Ocean, and her embarked Apache attack helicopters had been deployed days earlier) to supplement UK forces in Operation Ellamy.

Day 102 – 28 June 2011

HMS Liverpool used her main gun to fire warning shots at pro-Gaddafi maritime forces moving along Libya's Mediterranean coast just west of the city of Misrata, amid concerns a threat was posed to civilians due to recent repeated attempts to mine the harbour. After initially ignoring the first shell, a further three were fired and the vessels were forced to return to their port of departure.

Day 107 – 3 August 2011

Several rockets were fired at HMS Liverpool. She returned fire with her 4.5-inch main gun. The attack came after the ship had fired a barrage of illumination rounds in support of an air attack on the stronghold of Zliten.

Day 145 – 10 August 2011

RAF Tornados launched direct from RAF Marham in Norfolk to target command and control and air defence targets with Stormshadow cruise missiles.

Day 151 – 16 August 2011

Since the start of military operations on 19 March, Royal Air Force, Royal Navy, and Army Air Corps precision strikes were reported to have damaged or destroyed some 870 former regime targets.

HMS Liverpool was involved in the most intense shore-bombardment of the war. Liverpool had been tasked by a patrol aircraft to fire illumination rounds over the city of Zlitan. While conducting this mission, Liverpool came under fire from a Loyalist shore-battery. Liverpool responded by firing three rounds from her 4.5 inch gun, silencing the battery. Later on the same day, a patrol aircraft spotted a large pro-Gaddafi vehicle convoy carrying weapons and ammunition. Liverpool fired 54 shells from her 4.5-inch gun at the convoy, destroying or severely damaging many of the vehicles. During the ensuing chaos on the ground, NATO aircraft destroyed the remainder of the convoy.

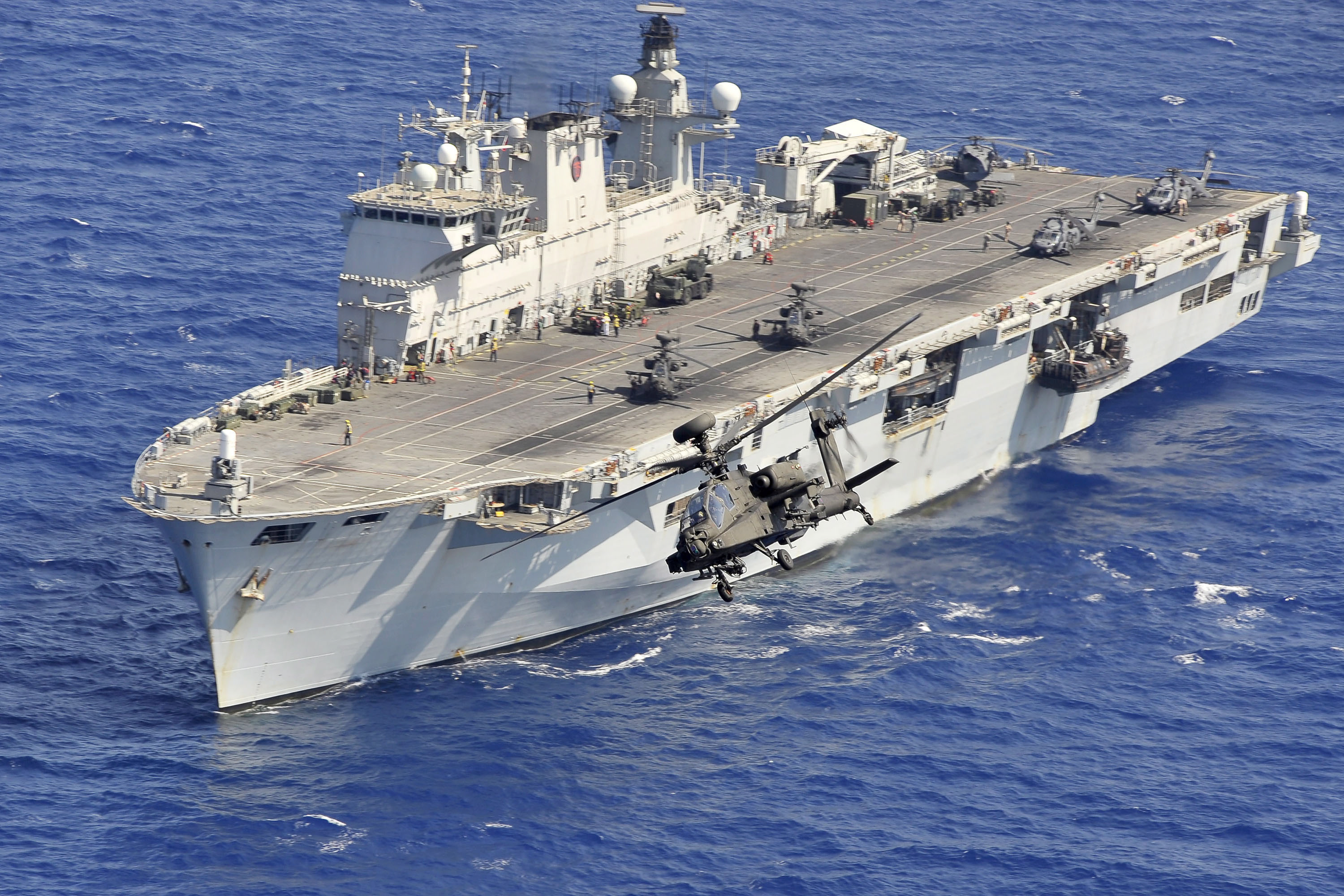
Apache helicopter takes off from HMS Ocean during Operation Ellamy

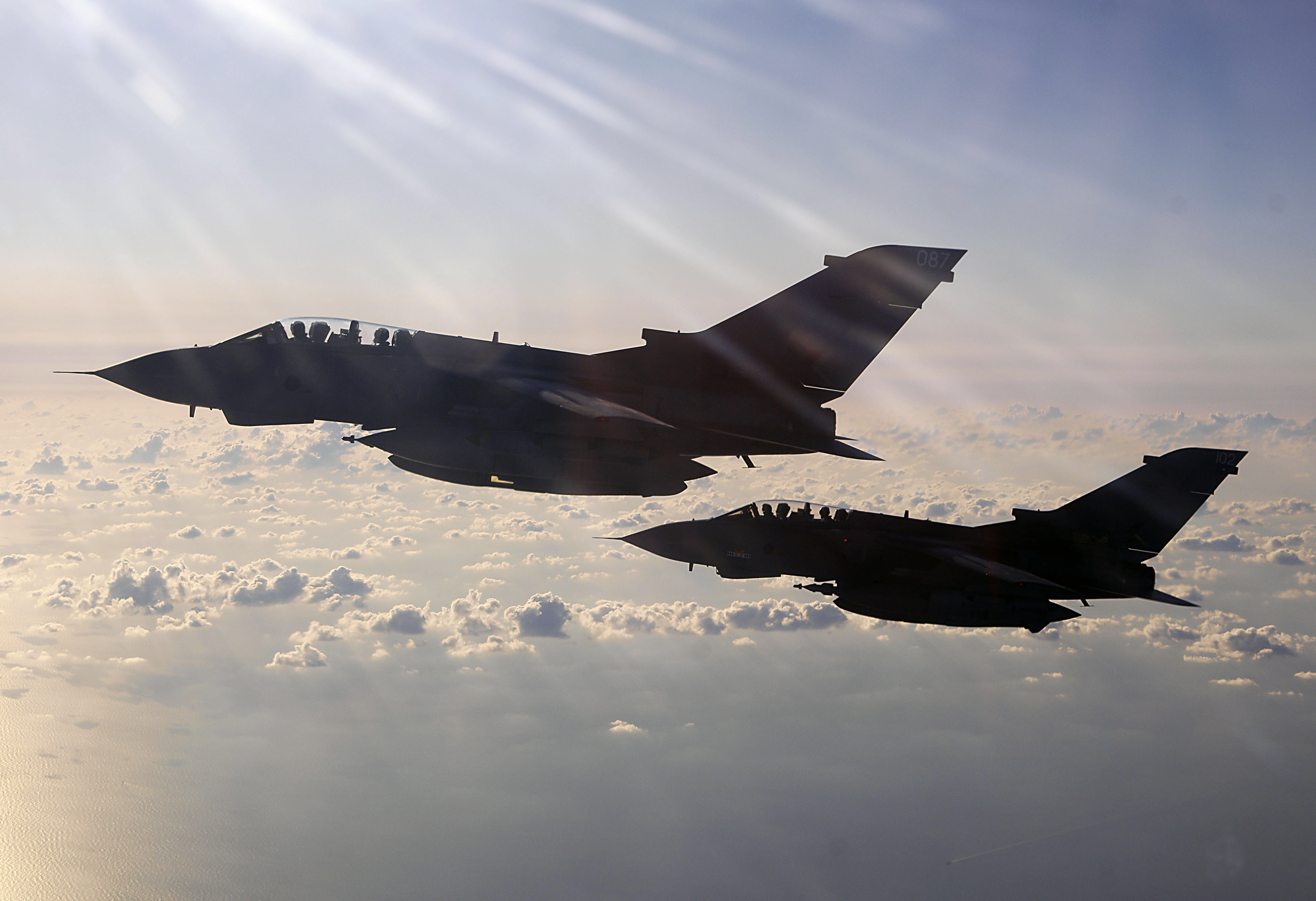
RAF Tornado GR4 aircraft during Operation Ellamy

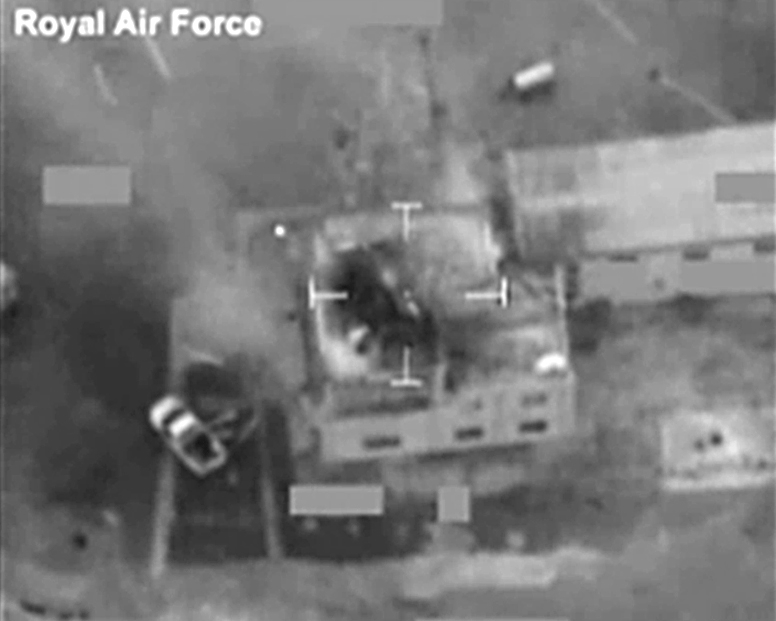
RAF Tornados destroying Libyan radar station

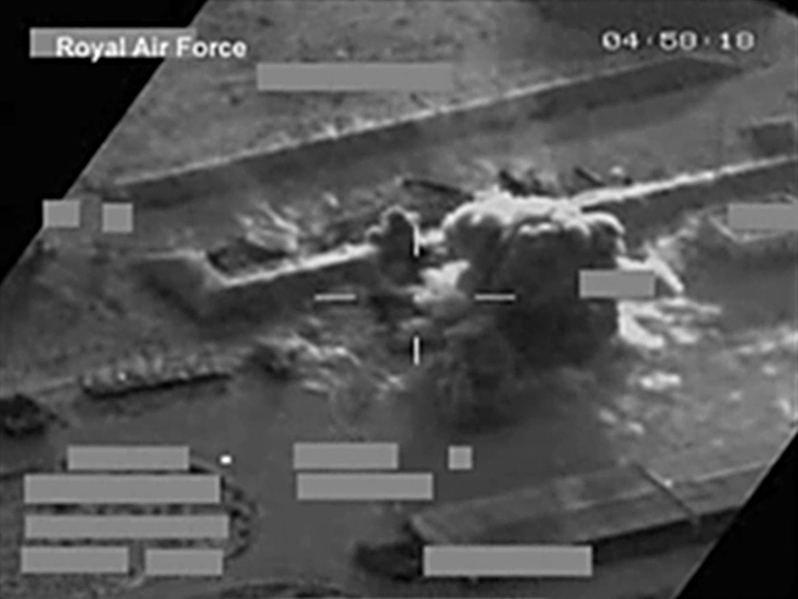
Tornado GR4 attack on Libyan SCUD launcher

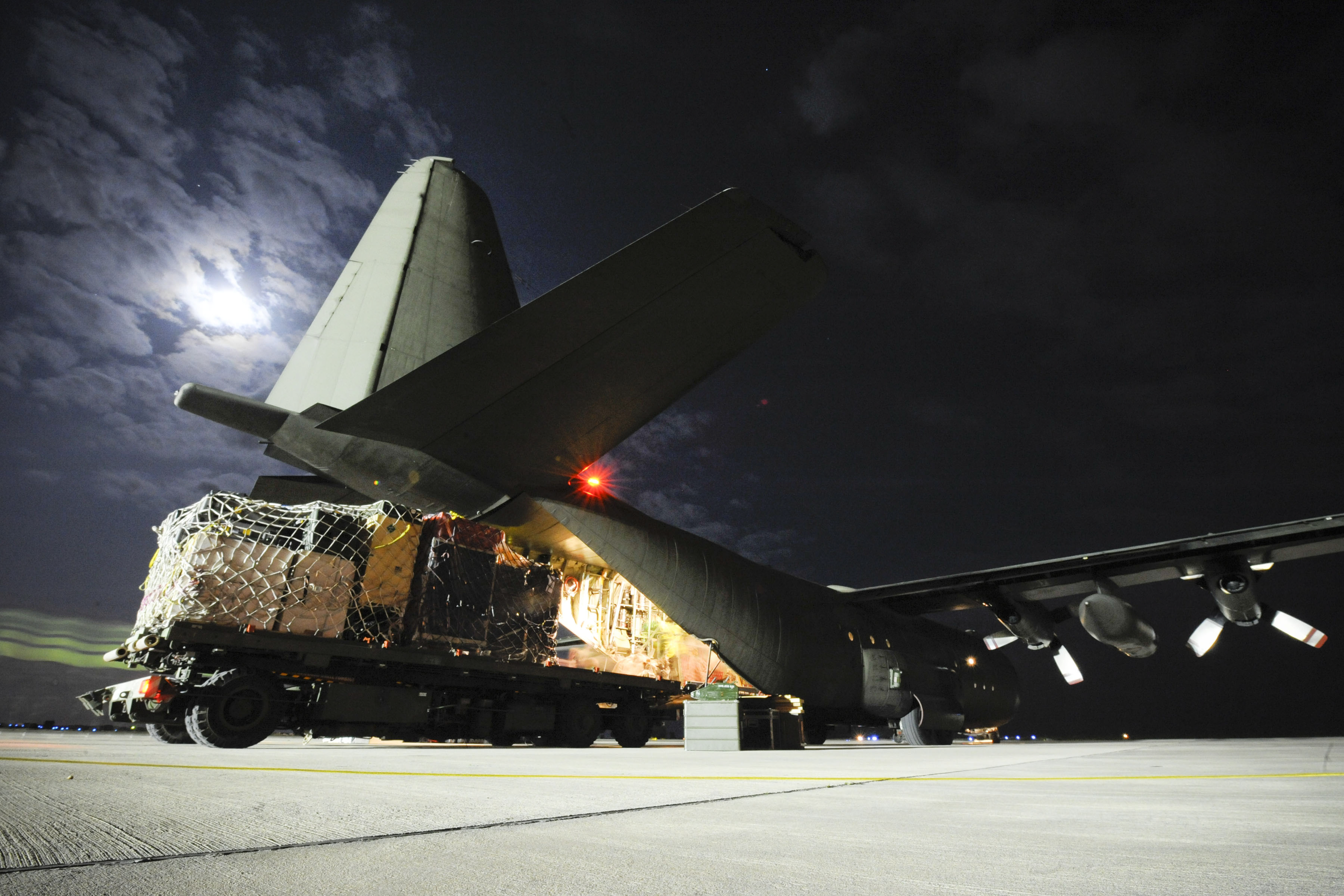
RAF C-130 Hercules delivers stores for Operation Ellamy
