= Second Battle of Benghazi =

2011 battle of the Libyan Civil War

Coordinates: 32°07′N 20°04′E

- Part of Libyan Civil War
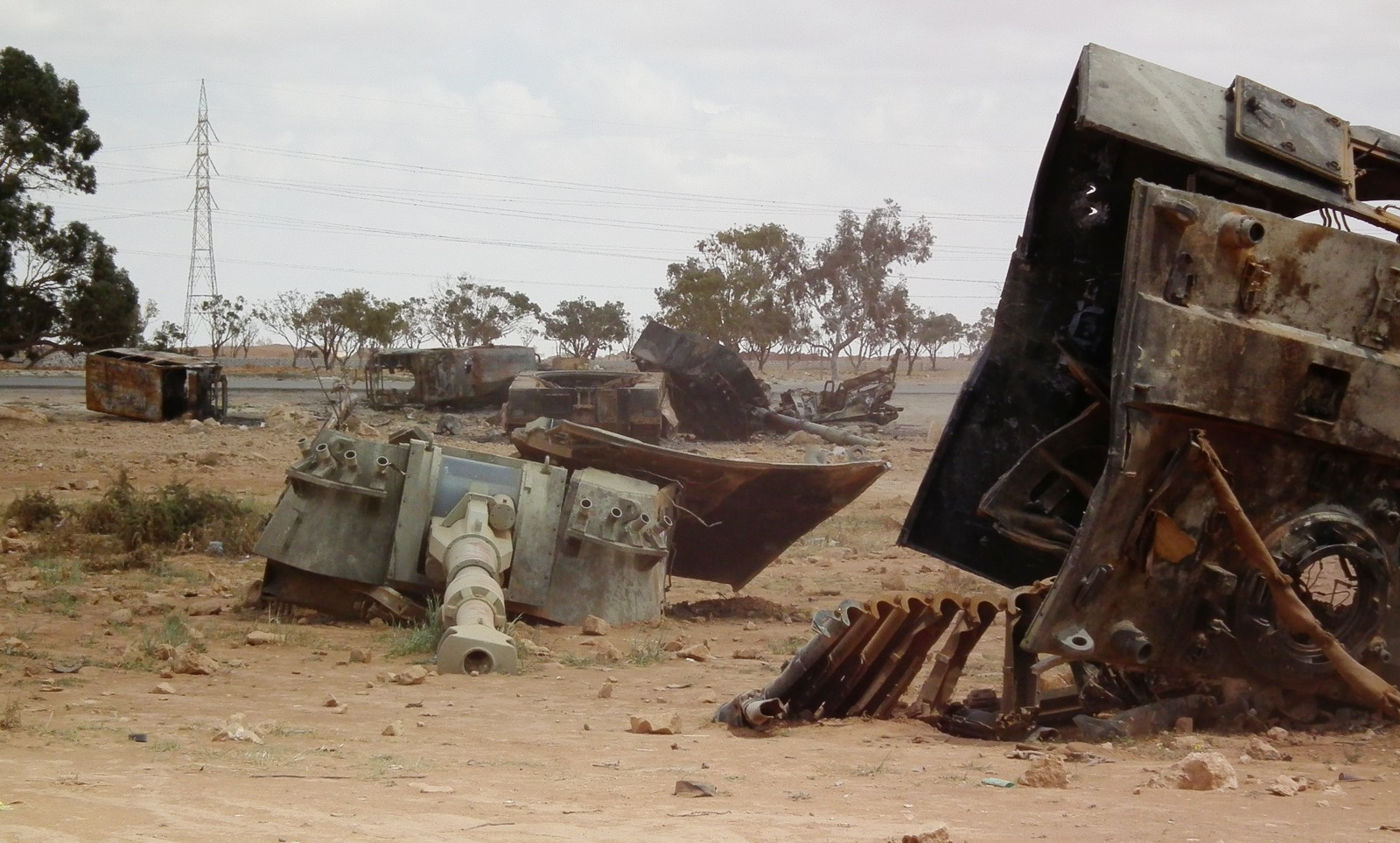
- Remains of two Palmaria heavy howitzers of the Gaddafi forces, destroyed by French warplanes on the west-southern outskirts of Benghazi, in Opération Harmattan on 19 March 2011.
Date	19–20 March 2011
Location	Benghazi, Libya
Result	Decisive Anti-Gaddafi victory

Belligerents
(Libya) Anti-Gaddafi forces; National Liberation Army; Free Libyan Air Force; (United Nations) UN coalition forces; France	(Libya) Gaddafi Loyalists; Libyan Army; Paramilitary forces

Commanders and leaders
(Libya) Abdul Fatah Younis	(Libya) Khamis Gaddafi (Libya) Ali Sharif al-Rifi

Strength
8,000 defected soldiers (rebel claim); Thousands of volunteers and militia 20 French fighter jets	Unknown

Casualties and losses
(Libya) Anti-Gaddafi forces: 261 killed; MiG-23 shot down	27–30 killed; 50 captured; 70 vehicles destroyed: 14 tanks or SP howitzers, 20 APCs, 2 mobile MRLs, 1 mobile SAM and 33 jeeps, SUVs, technicals or trucks; 4 tanks captured
- *The number of dead on the rebel side includes both opposition fighters and civilians

The Second Battle of Benghazi was fought between army units and militiamen loyal to Libyan leader Muammar Gaddafi, and anti-Gaddafi forces in Benghazi on 19-20 March 2011 during the Libyan Civil War. The battle marked the start of a United Nations-mandated military intervention in the conflict, with fighter jets from the French Air Force attacking and destroying several pro-Gaddafi units, forcing them to retreat.

On 18 March, Gaddafi's forces bypassed Ajdabiya by using the coastal roads instead of the roads directly linked with Ajdabiya, avoiding the need to capture Ajdabiya to proceed. By night the loyalist troops had positioned themselves within kilometres of Benghazi's two southern entry points, the western southern gate being called the west gate.

== Battle ==
=== Initial assault on the city ===
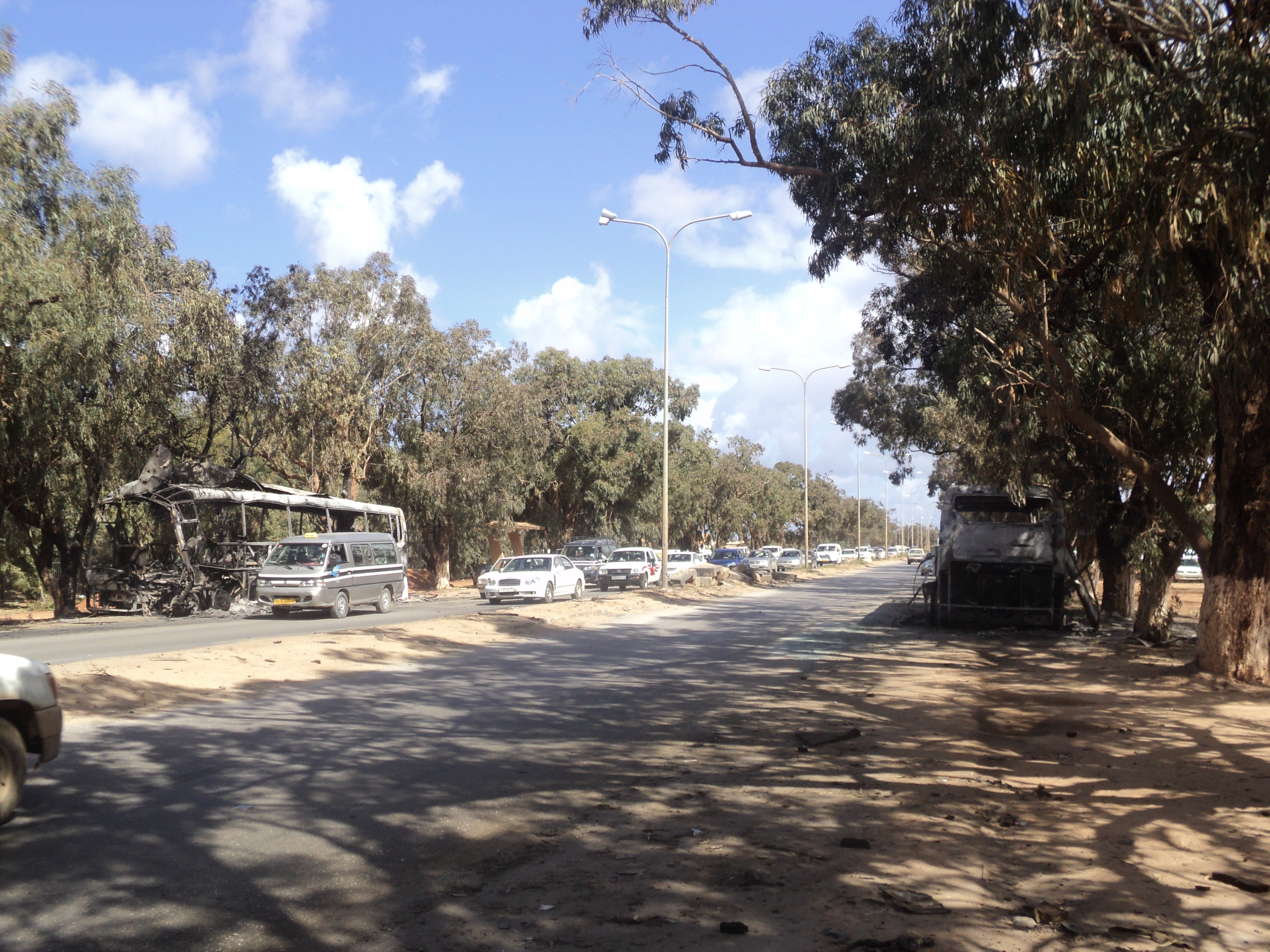
Burned buses near Garyounis university, Benghazi, possibly of pro-Gaddafi forces, as a result of the ground battle.

At 7:30 am local time on 19 March, Gaddafi's forces began artillery shelling the city. At around 9:00 am local time they entered the city from west and south with tanks. Rebel armoured units engaged the initial loyalist armoured column at around 10:00 am. Twelve T-72 tanks spearheaded the main thrust into the city, and by 10:30 am, it seemed that Benghazi was in danger of falling to Pro Gaddafi forces. A rebel tank, aging and rusted, opened fire on the lead pro Gaddafi tank, damaging it and forced its occupants to abandon the vehicle. The tanks behind the lead vehicle all began a withdrawal from the area, under rebel fire, and retreated apparently to the city limits.

By 2:30 pm local time the opposition fighters had repelled the first wave of loyalist forces out of the city. During the daytime battles, a rebel MiG-23 crashed to the ground in the outskirts of Benghazi. The pilot, Colonel Mohammed Mbarak al-Okaili, remained in the plane until moments before the crash before ejecting but was reported not to have survived the crash. The cause of the crash was unclear, but may have been a catastrophic engine failure or friendly fire from rebel air-defences that had mistaken it for a loyalist plane. This prompted rebels to use loudspeakers, mainly from mosques, urging not to attack the planes.

=== France intervenes, loyalists retreat ===
At around 4:00 pm local time, French fighter jets entered Libyan airspace and flew over Benghazi, conducting aerial reconnaissance missions and preparing to intervene. Then, at 4:45 pm, coalition intervention began as a French fighter jet fired on and destroyed several loyalist armored vehicles. Later, Al Jazeera reported that French fighter jets had destroyed at least four of the regime's force's tanks; however, this was not confirmed by France.

On the morning of the next day, air attacks were conducted against a loyalist tank column from 4:00 am for two hours. It was confirmed by a Reuters reporter that at least seven tanks and two armored personnel carriers were destroyed in the French air strikes.

Admiral Mullen of the United States announced on 20 March, that the international coalition had stopped the regime's progression on Benghazi.
