= HMCS Charlottetown =

Several Canadian naval units have been named HMCS Charlottetown after the provincial capital of Prince Edward Island. Uniquely in Canadian naval history, two of these vessels had the same name and pennant number.

- HMCS Charlottetown (1941), a Flower-class corvette commissioned on 13 December 1941 and torpedoed and sunk in the St. Lawrence River on 11 September 1942.
- HMCS Charlottetown (1943), a River-class frigate commissioned on 28 April 1944 and decommissioned on 25 March 1947.
- HMCS Charlottetown (FFH 339), a Halifax-class frigate commissioned in 1996.

== Battle honours ==
- Atlantic, 1942
- Gulf of St. Lawrence, 1942, 1944.
- Libya, 2011
- Arabian Sea
