= Rinaldo Veri =

Italian naval officer (born 1952)

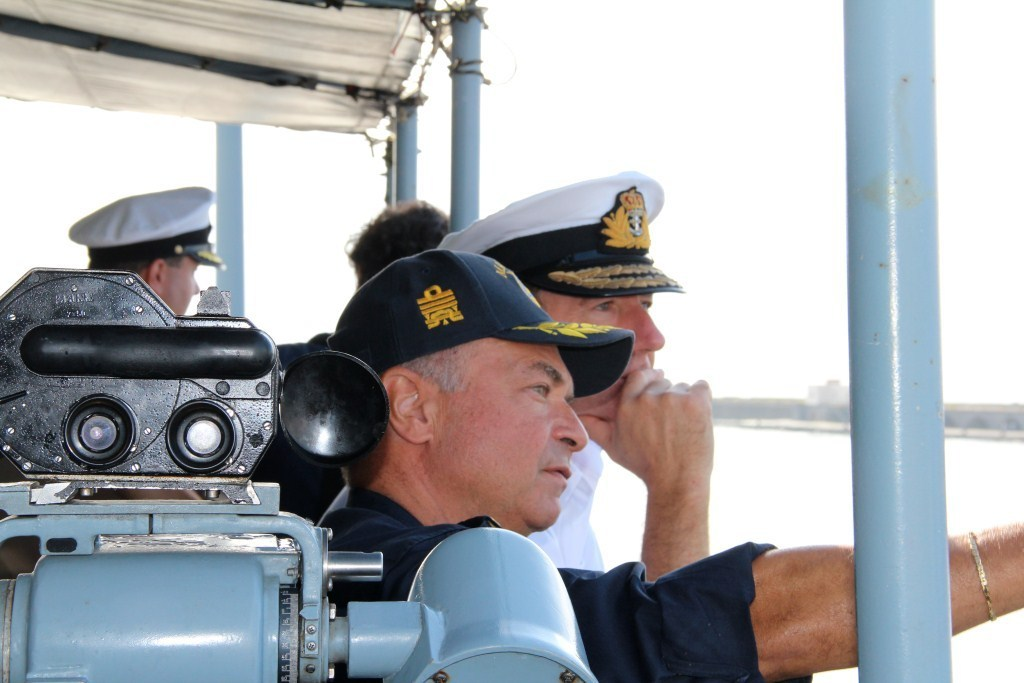
- Born: 22 April 1952 (age 74); Bombay, India
- Military career
- Allegiance: Italy
- Branch: Italian Navy
- Service years: 1971–2015
- Rank: Vice Admiral
- Commands: NATO Allied Maritime Command Naples; Chief of Staff of the Italian Joint Operations Headquarters (COI)

Rinaldo Veri (born 22 April 1952) is an Italian naval officer. He was promoted to the rank of Ammiraglio di squadra (equivalent to Vice admiral) on July 1, 2010 and assumed command of the naval forces of NATO Allied Maritime Command Naples on 10 March 2011. As of 23 March 2011, he was commanding NATO naval operation Operation Unified Protector to enforce the arms embargo against Libya in support of United Nations Security Council Resolutions 1970 and 1973.
