= Opération Harmattan =

2011 French military intervention in Libya

- Part of 2011 military intervention in Libya
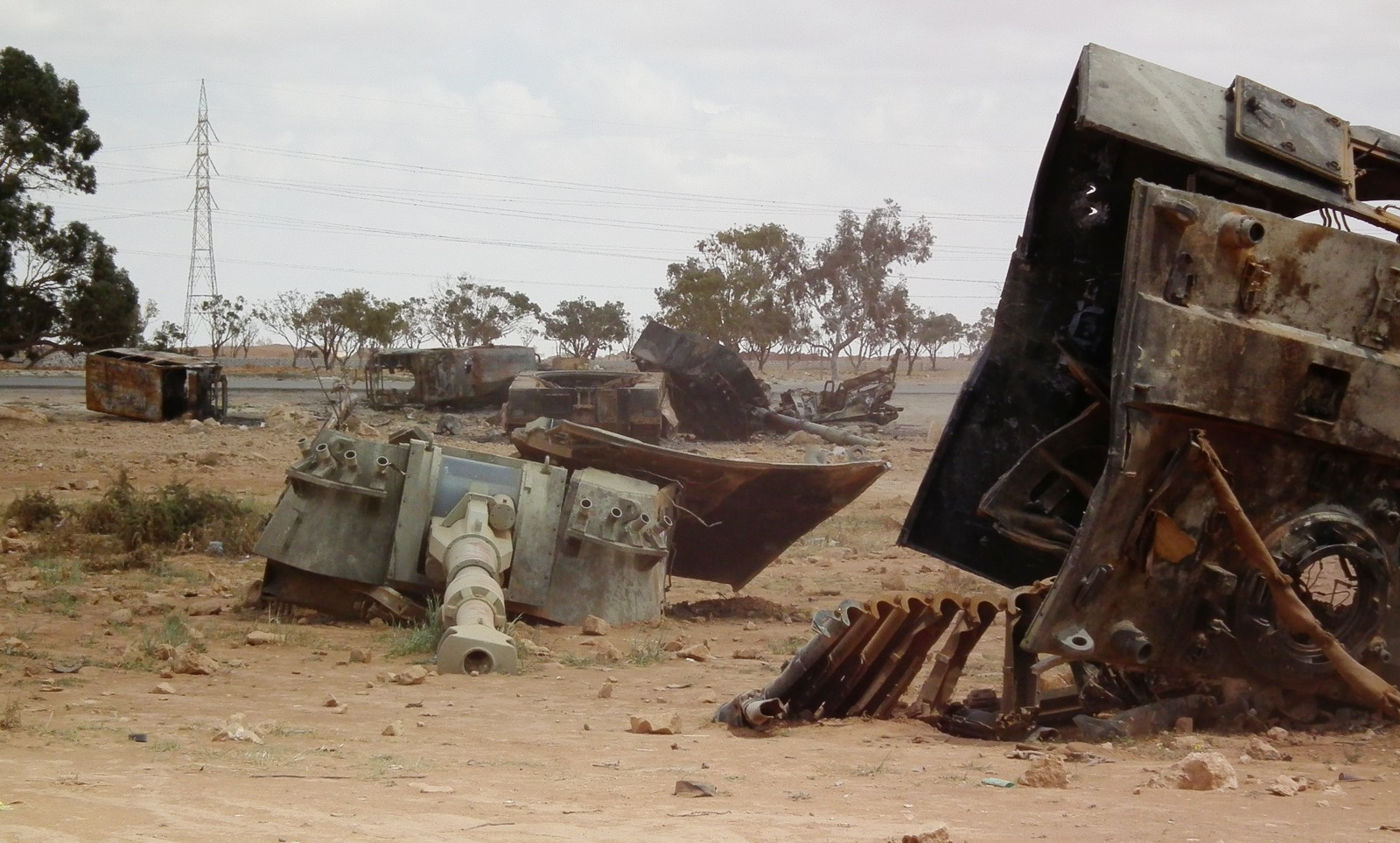
- Remains of three Palmaria heavy howitzers of the Gaddafi forces destroyed by French warplanes at the south-western outskirts of Benghazi on 19 March 2011.
Date	19 March 2011 – 31 March 2011
Location	Libya
Result	French and NATO victory/Effective no-fly zone established Operations handed over to NATO Operation Unified Protector

Belligerents
France	Libyan Arab Jamahiriya

Commanders and leaders
(France) Nicolas Sarkozy; (France) François Fillon; (France) Édouard Guillaud; (France) Jean-Paul Paloméros; (France) Pierre-François Forissier	(Libya) Muammar Gaddafi; (de facto Commander-in-Chief); (Libya) Abu-Bakr Yunis Jabr; (Minister of Defense); (Libya) Khamis al-Gaddafi; (Khamis Brigade Commander); (Libya) Ali Sharif al-Rifi; (Air Force Commander)

Strength
See deployed forces	See Libyan Armed Forces

Casualties and losses
None	Multiple tanks, aircraft, artillery units and ground targets destroyed
- Unknown, unverified claim by Gaddafi-controlled Libyan state media of 48 civilians killed, 150 wounded as a result of all UN operations 40 civilians killed (in Tripoli; Vatican claim)

Opération Harmattan was the French participation in the 2011 military intervention in Libya. It was named for the Harmattan, which are hot dry winds that blow over the Sahara, mostly between November and March. The United States' counterpart to this was Operation Odyssey Dawn, the Canadian counterpart was Operation Mobile and the British counterpart was Operation Ellamy. The no-fly zone was proposed during the Libyan Civil War to prevent government forces loyal to Muammar Gaddafi from carrying out air attacks on anti-Gaddafi forces. Several countries prepared to take immediate military action at a conference in Paris on 19 March 2011.

French Dassault Rafale multirole fighters began reconnaissance missions on 19 March and were the first among the coalition to attack Libyan forces, destroying four tanks.

== Deployed forces ==
- French Air Force
  - 5 × Rafale fighters from EC 01.007 Provence, based at Naval Air Station Sigonella in Sicily, Italy
  - 6 × Mirage 2000-5 fighters from EC 01.002 Cigogne, Dijon – Longvic Air Base
  - 6 × Mirage 2000D fighter-bombers from EC 03.003 Ardennes, Nancy – Ochey Air Base
  - 2 × Mirage F1CR reconnaissance aircraft from ER 02.033 Savoie, Reims – Champagne Air Base
  - 6 × C135 aerial refueling planes from GRV 02.093 Bretagne, Istres-Le Tubé Air Base
  - An E-3F AWACS plane from 36ème EDCA, Avord Air Base
  - A C-160G SIGINT electronic surveillance aircraft from EET 01.054 Dunkerque, Metz-Frescaty Air Base
  - Commando Parachutiste de l'Air companies 20 and 30 forward deployed to Solenzara Air Base, Corsica
- French Navy
  - Task Force 473
    - Aircraft carrier Charles de Gaulle (R91)
      - 10 × Rafale M fighters from Flottille 12F
      - 6 × Super-Etendard strike aircraft from Flottille 17F
      - 2 × E-2C airborne early warning aircraft
      - 2 × Dauphin multipurpose helicopters
      - 2 × Alouette III utility helicopters
      - French Air Force detachment of a Puma and 2 × Caracal transport helicopters
    - Anti-air destroyer Forbin (D620) (later transferred to Operation Unified Protector)
    - Anti-air destroyer Chevalier Paul (D621)
    - Anti-air destroyer Jean Bart (D615)
    - Anti-submarine destroyer Georges Leygues (D640)
    - Anti-submarine destroyer Dupleix (D641)
    - Anti-submarine destroyer Jean de Vienne (D643)
    - Frigate Aconit (F713)
    - Frigate Courbet (F712)
    - Replenishment tanker Meuse (A607)
    - Nuclear attack submarine Améthyste (S605)
  - Landing helicopter dock Tonnerre (L9014)
    - 14 × Aérospatiale Gazelle
    - 4 × Eurocopter Tiger
    - 2 × Eurocopter Puma
  - 2 × Atlantique 2 signals intelligence aircraft based at Naval Air Station Sigonella in Sicily, Italy

== Summary of action ==
=== Day 1: 19 March ===
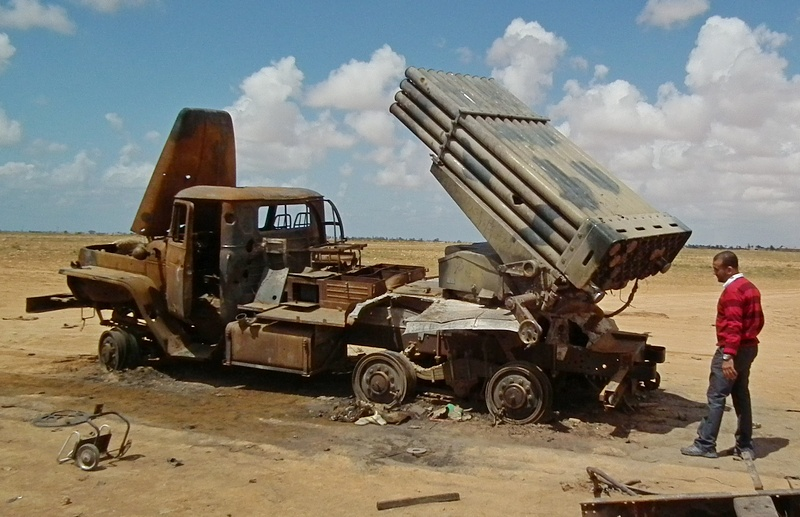
BM-21 Grad multiple rocket launcher of the Libyan army, destroyed during the first attack wave on 19 March.

The French Navy anti-air destroyer Forbin and anti-air frigate Jean Bart were already off Libya when the operation commenced.

The French Air Force deployed in its first strike force eight Rafale fighters, two Mirage 2000-5 fighters and two Mirage 2000D fighter-bombers supported by other aircraft listed above.

Eight Rafale fighters patrolled the skies over Benghazi to prohibit the advance of Libyan ground forces. One opened fire on Libyan military vehicles at 16:45 local time. The Telegraph reported four Libyan tanks destroyed by French aircraft southwest of Benghazi.

Aircraft returning from combat missions landed at Solenzara Air Base on Corsica from which further combat sorties were launched.

=== Day 2: 20 March ===
Eleven sorties were carried out by French aircraft over Libya.

Task Force 473, the aircraft carrier Charles de Gaulle and its battle group, sailed from Toulon.

=== Day 3: 21 March ===
Up to this day, 55 sorties were carried out by French aircraft over Libya. The French Ministry of Defence (MoD) claimed a Mirage 2000-D destroyed another Libyan tank 100 km south of Benghazi.

=== Day 4: 22 March ===
Aircraft from Charles de Gaulle began operations over Libya, commencing with Rafale F3s conducting reconnaissance and patrols. Forbin and Jean Bart, which were already on station off Libya, joined Task Force 473. The number of combat aircraft forward deployed at Air Base 126 Solenzara was increased to 20 with the arrival of two more Mirage 2000-5 and two more Mirage 2000D, with support aircraft operating out of Saint-Dizier and Avord.

=== Day 5: 23 March ===
Rafale and Mirage 2000D aircraft from Solenzara and Rafale and Super Etendard aircraft from the Charles de Gaulle conducted reconnaissance and support sorties over Libya.

=== Day 6: 24 March ===
Rafale and Mirage 2000D aircraft attacked a Libyan air base, 250 kilometres (160 miles) inland from the Mediterranean Sea, with SCALP EG missiles. Rafale, Mirage 2000D and Super Etendard aircraft flew four joint interdiction missions against Libyan ground forces. A Rafale destroyed a Libyan Soko G-2 Galeb light attack jet with an AASM air-to-surface missile as it landed at Misrata. A patrol of two Mirage 2000Ds, equipped with GBU-12 laser-guided bombs, attacked loyalist artillery near Ajdabiyah.

=== Day 7: 25 March ===
Qatari aircraft attached to Operation Odyssey Dawn and French aircraft conducted joint reconnaissance sorties in the regions of Misrata, Zintan, Sirte and Ajdabiyah. Four Mirage 2000Ds conducted interdiction missions against loyalist artillery near Ajdabiyah. Two French and two Qatari Mirage 2000-5s conducted air interdiction missions. Three French Mirage 2000-5s were moved from Solenzara to Souda Air Base on Crete.

=== Day 8: 26 March ===
French aircraft carried out several air strikes around Zintan and Misrata, destroying at least five Soko G-2 Galeb light attack jets and two Mi-35 helicopters on the ground. French and Qatari Mirage 2000-5s continued joint reconnaissance sorties from Souda Air Base.

=== Day 9: 27 March ===
Air Force and Navy Rafales attacked a command centre south of Tripoli. French and Qatari Mirage 2000-5s conducted joint patrols and air interdiction missions from Souda Air Base. The number of French Mirage 2000-5s based as Souda was increased to four.

=== Day 10: 28 March ===
Air operations were planned to focus on the region around Zintan and Misrata. Air force Rafales and Mirage 2000Ds and a joint patrol of Navy Rafales and Super Etendards bombed an ammunition dump at Gharyan, 100 kilometres (62 mi) south of Tripoli. Mirage F1CRs conducted reconnaissance missions for the first time in the operation.

=== Day 11: 29 March ===
Two patrols of Air Force Rafales and Mirage 2000Ds and a patrol of Navy Rafales and Super Etendards attacked anti-aircraft missile sites 100 kilometres (62 mi) south west of Tripoli. Two joint patrols of French and Qatari Mirage 2000-5s conducted air interdiction sorties. Mirage 2000Ds and Super Etendards bombed a military depot 30 kilometres (19 mi) south of Tripoli.

=== Day 12: 30 March ===
A joint strike force of Air Force Rafales and Mirage 2000Ds and Navy Rafales and Super Etendards attacked anti-aircraft missile sites 20 kilometres (12 mi) south of Sirte. A patrol of two French and four Qatari Mirage 2000-5s conducted air interdiction sorties.

=== Day 13: 31 March ===
At 0600 GMT, NATO took command of all operations in Libya. Subsequent operations were conducted as part of Operation Unified Protector.

== See also ==
- Ouadi Doum air raid, 1986 French air raid on Libyan airbase in Chad
- Flottille 17F
