= Operation Mobile =

2011 Canadian Operation in Libya

- Part of 2011 military intervention in Libya
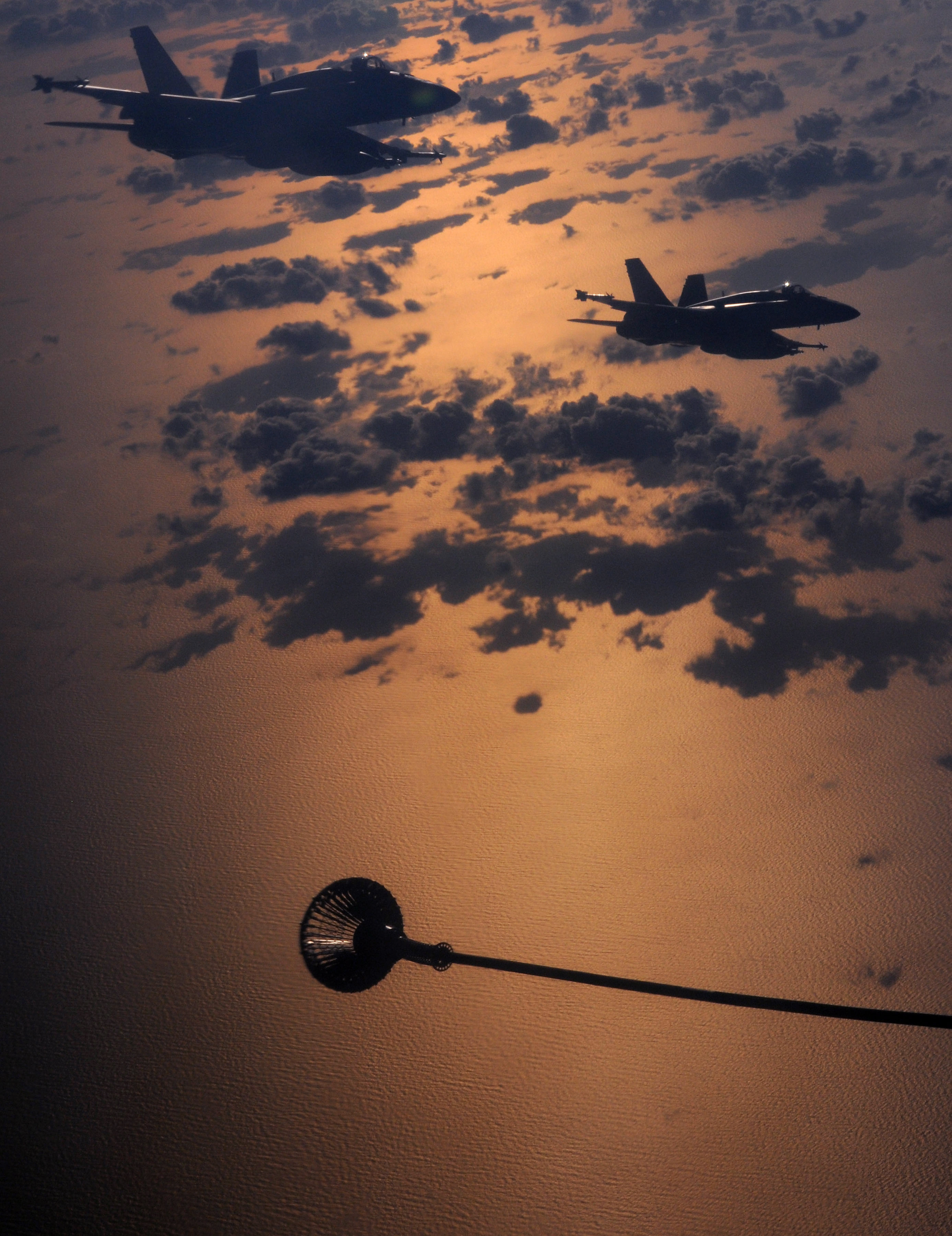
- Two CF-18s refuelling over Libya, 2011
| Date | 19 March – 1 November 2011 |
| Location | Libya |
| Result | Decisive Canadian victory: Effective no-fly zone established; Operations handed over to NATO Operation Unified Protector |

Belligerents
| Canada | Libya |

Commanders and leaders
| Stephen Harper; Peter MacKay; Charles Bouchard; Walter Natynczyk; André Deschamps | Muammar Gaddafi (executed) (History of Libya under Muammar Gaddafi) Abu-Bakr Jabr X (History of Libya under Muammar Gaddafi) Khamis Gaddafi † (History of Libya under Muammar Gaddafi) Ali Sharif al-Rifi |

Units involved
| Royal Canadian Air Force; Royal Canadian Navy | Libya Armed Forces of the Libyan Arab Jamahiriya |

Strength
| See deployed forces. 655 personnel at its peak. | Unknown |

Casualties and losses
| None | Unknown |

Operation Mobile (French: Opération Mobile) was the name given to Canadian Forces activities in the 2011 military intervention in Libya. The United States' counterpart to this was Operation Odyssey Dawn, the French counterpart was Opération Harmattan and the British counterpart was Operation Ellamy. The no-fly zone was proposed during the Libyan Civil War to prevent government forces loyal to Muammar Gaddafi from carrying out air attacks on anti-Gaddafi forces and civilians. The demonstrations in Libya were part of the larger Arab Spring movement that began in the country of Tunisia on 18 December 2010. When demonstrations began in Libya, the government of Muammar Gaddafi responded with systematic attacks by air and ground forces, and repression of the protesters. In a speech, Gaddafi promised to chase down the protesters and cleanse the country "house by house". Several countries prepared to take immediate military action at a conference in Paris on 19 March.

The no-fly zone was enforced by NATO's Operation Unified Protector. NATO took sole command of all operations in Libya from 06:00 GMT on 31 March, which effectively ended the U.S. Operation Odyssey Dawn, as all U.S. operations were absorbed into NATO's Unified Protector. The Canadian contribution continued to fall under Operation Mobile, which ceased activities on 1 November 2011.

== Canadian Forces ==
=== Royal Canadian Navy ===
On 1 March, Prime Minister Stephen Harper announced that HMCS Charlottetown would deploy from Halifax on 2 March to take part in Canadian and international operations already under way in Libya. Charlottetown departed CFB Halifax, and joined the Standing NATO Maritime Group 1 on 14 March, and arrived on station on 17 March.

HMCS Charlottetown is a Halifax-class frigate with a crew of about 240 officers and sailors, and a CH-124 Sea King helicopter and air detachment. With the other ships of Standing NATO Maritime Group 1, HMCS Charlottetown was engaged in regional maritime security operations in the central Mediterranean Sea. On 18 August, HMCS Vancouver took the place of HMCS Charlottetown for the remainder of the NATO mission in Libya. HMCS Charlottetown returned to Canada on 2 September.

=== Royal Canadian Air Force ===
Task Force Libeccio was the air detachment participating in the enforcement of the no-fly zone in Libya authorized by Resolution 1973, adopted by the U.N. Security Council on 17 March. The task force was named for the strong southwesterly wind that blows all year in the Mediterranean Sea. Task Force Libeccio comprised six CF-18 Hornet fighter aircraft, two Boeing CC-177 Globemasters, two CP-140 Auroras and about 200 Canadian Forces personnel, including aircrews and ground technicians from 425 Tactical Fighter Squadron at 3 Wing CFB Bagotville and 409 Tactical Fighter Squadron at 4 Wing CFB Cold Lake and other locations across Canada. The force also included two CC-150 Polaris air-to-air refuelling detachment from 437 Transport Squadron at 8 Wing Trenton, Ontario. Task Force Libeccio reached the region on 18 March.

CF-18 Hornets and CC-150 Polaris assets were based at Trapani-Birgi airbase in Sicily, Italy.

CP-140 Aurora aircraft were based at Naval Air Station Sigonella in Sicily, Italy.

Trapani Detachment:

- Seven CF-188 Hornet fighter aircraft (three pairs and a spare) from 425 Tactical Fighter Squadron and 409 Tactical Fighter Squadron at 4 Wing Cold Lake, Alberta;
- two CC-150 Polaris tanker from 437 Transport Squadron at 8 Wing Trenton, Ontario, and
- two CC-130H Hercules airlifters/air-to-air refuellers from 435 Transport Squadron at 17 Wing Winnipeg, Manitoba; and
- The Mission Support Flight.

Sigonella Detachment:

- Two CP-140 Aurora aircraft, one from 405 Long Range Patrol Squadron at 14 Wing Greenwood, Nova Scotia, and the other from 407 Long Range Patrol Squadron at 19 Wing Comox, British Columbia.

as of 05:30 GMT, 25 October 2011

Sorties to date

- CF-188 Hornet fighters 946
- CC-150 Polaris tankers 250
- CP-140 Aurora long-range patrol aircraft 181
- CC-130J Hercules airlifters 23
- CC-130 Hercules tankers 139

=== Deployed forces ===
- Royal Canadian Air Force
  - 6 × CF-18 Hornet multirole fighter jets (one more in reserve) from Trapani-Birgi Airport in Trapani, Italy
  - 2 × CC-177 Globemaster III strategic transport aircraft
  - 2 × CC-130J Hercules tactical transport aircraft
  - 2 × CC-150 Polaris air-to-air refuelling tankers
  - 2 × CP-140 Aurora maritime patrol aircraft
- Royal Canadian Navy
  - HMCS Charlottetown, a Halifax-class frigate. (Deployed from 2 March 2011 - 17 August 2011)
    - 1 × CH-124 Sea King (Operated by the Royal Canadian Air Force)
  - HMCS Vancouver, a Halifax-class frigate. (Deployed from 7 July 2011 – 1 November 2011)
    - 1 × CH-124 Sea King (Operated by the Royal Canadian Air Force)
- Canadian Special Operations Forces Command
  - Joint Task Force 2

An additional six CF-18s were placed on standby in Canada, ready to deploy immediately if called upon.

== Summary of action ==
- 21 March: Start of Operations

Four CF-18 fighters and two CC-150 Polaris refuellers operating from Trapani-Birgi Airport flew their first mission in Libya on 21 March, acting as armed escorts to coalition jets conducting bombings. Canada expected to take part in bombings as soon as the following night. HMCS Charlottetown also began patrolling the waters north of Libya in order to help to enforce a NATO blockade of Libya.

Defence Minister Peter MacKay stated that another six CF-18 fighter jets are on standby to deploy if needed.

- 22 March

Two CF-18s again flew missions on Tuesday, 22 March. However they had to abandon their planned attack on a Gaddafi Libyan airfield as the high possibility of collateral damage was against the strict rules of engagement. For a second day a CC-150 tanker refuelled Canadian aircraft as well as other coalition aircraft.

- 23 March

The third day marked the first time Canadian jets bombed Libya since the campaign began. This occurred as four CF-18s flew two missions against an ammunition depot in Misrata, dropping four 227 kg (500-pound) laser-guided bombs, and supported by two CC-150 Polaris tankers.

In other developments, Commodore John Newton, of the Royal Canadian Navy stated that the crew of HMCS Charlottetown were prepared to conduct boarding operations and had been training for search and rescue of downed pilots.

- 24 March

Two CF-18s flew two air interdiction patrols over Libyan airspace. A CC-150 Polaris took part of the operations providing fuel for Canadian and other coalition aircraft. Defence Minister Peter MacKay announced Canada would send two CP-140 Auroras to provide maritime surveillance in support of the United Nations arms embargo against Libya. The Canadian Forces deployed 80 personnel from 14 Wing Greenwood and 19 Wing Comox.

- 25 March

Two CF-18s conducted one sortie and released several precision-guided munitions against electronic warfare sites near Misrata. Two CC-150 also took part of operation and refuelled both Canadian and coalition aircraft. HMCS Charlottetown patrolled the north of Libya and investigated a vessel in distress.

- 27 March

A second ammunition depot, this time located 92 kilometres (57 mi) south of Misrata, was destroyed in an operation by four CF-18s utilizing 227 kg (500-pound) laser-guided bombs; in addition CF-18s coordinated other attacks involving up to 20 other coalition aircraft. Enforcing the arms embargo a CP-140A Aurora flew the first Canadian Maritime Patrol mission.

- 29 March

Two CF-18s help the rebels by attacking targets in Misrata. Canadian CP-140 Aurora surveillance aircraft began around this time, a psychological warfare operation over Libya using airborne leaflet propaganda and radio transmissions. The broadcast of propaganda messages over Libyan territory led to the Gaddafi regime trying to jam the transmissions via electronic warfare.

- 31 March

From 08:00 EET, NATO took sole command of air operations over Libya under Operation Unified Protector, taking over from U.S. Africa Command.

- 21 April

Pilots flew more than 100 missions over Libya since the beginning of Operation Mobile. During the past week they were deployed 38 times. They attacked armoured vehicles, ammunition depots, and mobile rocket launchers.

- 13 May

HMCS Charlottetown was involved in a naval battle near the port city of Misrata. Charlettetown was conducting patrols at around 2 a.m. local time with other Allied warships when a number of fast, small boats launched an attack. No warships sustained any damage.

This was the first time since the Korean War that a Canadian warship was involved in a naval battle.

- 19 May

Canadian pilots participated in NATO air strikes that destroyed eight Libyan warships. HMCS Charlottetown also participated in the operation.

- 27 May

Canadian pilots dropped 240 laser-guided bombs on Libyan targets since 31 March.

- 2 June

On Monday morning, HMCS Charlottetown came under heavy fire. The Libyan army had deployed a dozen BM21 launch vehicles at the port city of Misrata and opened fire on the Canadian warship. Charlottetown did not return fire and did not sustain damage.

- 16 June

During the preceding week throughout four days CF-18s destroyed armoured vehicles, field headquarters, ammunition depots and command-and-control structures with laser-guided bombs. During the same week, CF-18s were recalled to one target because the laser-targeting system on an allied jet failed.

- 10 July

HMCS Vancouver under the command of Commander Bradly Peats, with 225 crew members and a detachment from 443 Maritime Helicopter Squadron, departed CFB Esquimalt en route to the Mediterranean Sea to relieve HMCS Charlottetown, which had been on station off the Libyan coast since March.

- 29 July

Canadian CP-140 Aurora surveillance aircraft started a psychological warfare operation over Libya. The surveillance aircraft started broadcasting propaganda messages over Libyan territory while the Gaddafi regime has tried to jam the transmissions using electronic warfare.

- 18 August

A change of command ceremony was held in Palma de Mallorca, Spain, where HMCS Vancouver officially relieved HMCS Charlottetown. The ceremony officially marked that Task Force Charlottetown became Task Force Vancouver, and the Task Force command was transferred from Commander Craig Skjerpen to Commander Bradley Peats.

- 1 November

Operation Mobile officially ceased operations and began mission closure activities.

== See also ==
- List of Canadian military operations
- List of Canadian Peacekeeping Missions
