= HMCS Charlottetown (FFH 339) =

Royal Canadian Navy frigate

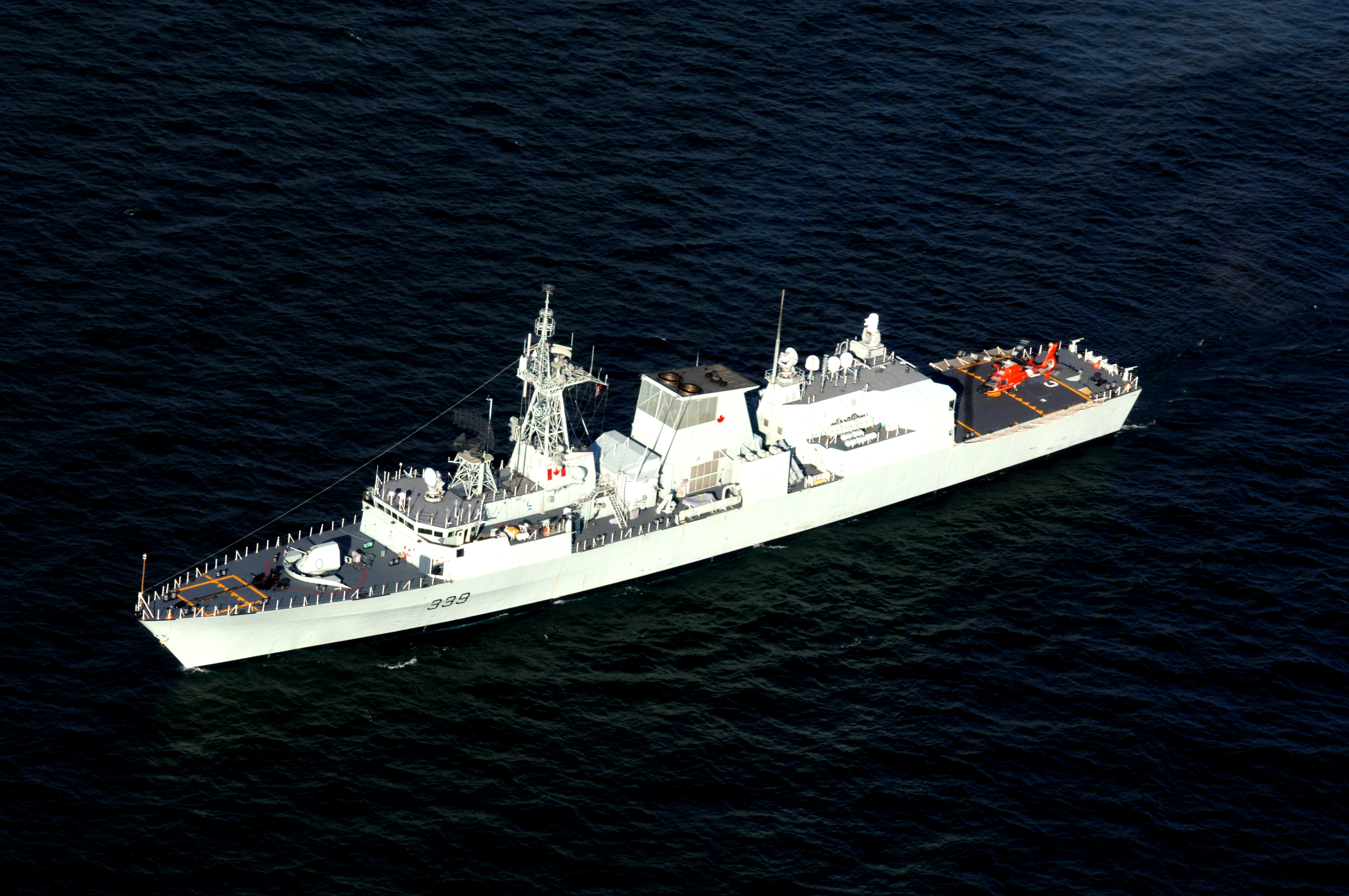
- HMCS Charlottetown at Cleveland, Ohio in 2008

History

Canada
- Name: Charlottetown
- Namesake: Charlottetown, Prince Edward Island
- Builder: Saint John Shipbuilding Ltd., Saint John
- Laid down: 18 December 1993
- Launched: 1 October 1994
- Commissioned: 9 September 1995
- Refit: HCM/FELEX April 2013 – April 2014
- Home port: CFB Halifax
- Identification: Pennant number FFH 339; MMSI number: 316130000
- Motto: "All Challenges Squarely Met"
- Honours and awards: Atlantic 1942, Gulf of St. Lawrence 1942, 1944, Arabian Sea, Libya
- Status: ship in active service
- Badge: A representation of Queen's Square in Charlottetown with the Coronation crown of Queen Charlotte in the centre and 4 other squares surrounding in black and white.

General characteristics
- Class & type: Halifax-class frigate
- Displacement: 3,995 tonnes (light); 4,795 tonnes (operational)
- Length: 134.2 m (440 ft 3 in)
- Beam: 16.5 m (54 ft 2 in)
- Draught: 7.1 m (23 ft 4 in)
- Propulsion: 2 × LM2500 gas turbines; 1 × SEMT Pielstick diesel engine
- Speed: 30 knots (56 km/h; 35 mph)
- Range: 9,500 nmi (17,594 km; 10,932 mi)
- Complement: 255 (including air detachment)
- Armament: Missiles; 2 × quad Mk 141 canisters for 8 × RGM-84 Harpoon block II AShM/LAM; 2 × 8-cell Mk 48 vertical launch system firing 16 × RIM-162 Evolved Sea Sparrow block II SAM/SSM; Guns; 1 × Bofors 57 mm Mk3 gun; 1 × Phalanx CIWS Mk 15 Mod 21 block 1B; 4 × .50-calibre M2HQ Mini Typhoon NRWS; Torpedoes; 2 × twin 324 mm (12.8 in) Mk 32 torpedo tubes for 24 × Honeywell Mk 46 Mod 5 torpedoes
- Aircraft carried: 1 × CH-148 Cyclone
- Aviation facilities: Hangar and flight deck

HMCS Charlottetown is a Halifax-class frigate that has served in the Royal Canadian Navy since 1995. Charlottetown is the tenth ship in her class which is based on the Canadian Patrol Frigate Project. She is the third vessel to carry the designation HMCS Charlottetown. Charlottetown, assigned to Maritime Forces Atlantic (MARLANT) and homeported at CFB Halifax, serves on missions protecting Canada's sovereignty in the Atlantic Ocean and enforcing Canadian laws in its territorial sea and exclusive economic zone. Charlottetown has also participated in several NATO missions, patrolling the Atlantic Ocean as part of Standing Naval Force Atlantic (STANAVFORLANT) and its successors Standing NATO Maritime Group 1 and 2 (SNMG1 / SNMG2). Charlottetown has also been deployed on missions throughout the Atlantic and to the Indian Ocean, specifically the Persian Gulf and Arabian Sea on anti-terrorism operations.

== Description and design ==
The Halifax-class frigate design, emerging from the Canadian Patrol Frigate Project, was ordered by the Canadian Forces in 1977 as a replacement for the aging St. Laurent, Restigouche, Mackenzie, and Annapolis classes of destroyer escorts, which were all tasked with anti-submarine warfare. Charlottetown was ordered in December 1987 as part of the second batch of frigates. To reflect the changing long term strategy of the Navy during the 1980s and 1990s, the Halifax-class frigates were designed as a general purpose warships with particular focus on anti-submarine capabilities.

As built, the Halifax-class vessels displaced 4,750 long tons (4,826 t) and were 134.6 metres (441 ft 9 in) long overall and 124.5 metres (408 ft 5 in) between perpendiculars with a beam of 16.4 metres (53 ft 8 in) and a draught of 5.0 metres (16 ft 4 in). That made them slightly larger than the Iroquois-class destroyers. The vessels are propelled by two shafts with Escher Wyss controllable pitch propellers driven by a CODOG system of two General Electric LM2500 gas turbines, generating 47,500 shaft horsepower (35,421 kW) and one SEMT Pielstick 20 PA6 V 280 diesel engine, generating 8,800 shaft horsepower (6,562 kW).

This gives the frigates a maximum speed of 29 knots (54 km/h; 33 mph) and a range of 7,000 nautical miles (12,964 km; 8,055 mi) at 15 knots (28 km/h; 17 mph) while using their diesel engines. Using their gas turbines, the ships have a range of 3,930 nautical miles (7,278 km; 4,523 mi) at 18 knots (33 km/h; 21 mph). The Halifax class have a complement of 198 naval personnel of which 17 are officers and 17 aircrew of which 8 are officers.

=== Armament and aircraft ===
As built the Halifax-class vessels deployed the CH-124 Sea King helicopter, which acted in concert with shipboard sensors to seek out and destroy submarines at long distances from the ships. The ships have a helicopter deck fitted with a "bear trap" system allowing the launch and recovery of helicopters in up to sea state 6. The Halifax class also carries a close-in anti-submarine weapon in the form of the Mark 46 torpedo, launched from twin Mark 32 Mod 9 torpedo tubes in launcher compartments either side of the forward end of the helicopter hangar.

As built, the anti-shipping role is supported by the RGM-84 Harpoon Block 1C surface-to-surface missile, mounted in two quadruple launch tubes at the main deck level between the funnel and the helicopter hangar. For anti-aircraft self-defence the ships are armed with the Sea Sparrow vertical launch surface-to-air missile in two Mk 48 Mod 0 eight-cell launchers placed to port and starboard of the funnel. The vessels carry 16 missiles. A Raytheon/General Dynamics Phalanx Mark 15 Mod 21 Close-In Weapon System (CIWS) is mounted on top of the helicopter hangar for "last-ditch" defence against targets that evade the Sea Sparrow.

As built, the main gun on the forecastle is a 57 mm (2.2 in)/70 calibre Mark 2 gun from Bofors. (Note: The 70 calibre denotes the length of the gun. This means that the length of the gun barrel is 70 times the bore diameter.) The gun is capable of firing 2.4-kilogram (5.3 lb) shells at a rate of 220 rounds per minute at a range of more than 17 kilometres (11 mi). The vessels also carry eight 12.7 mm (0.50 in) machine guns.

=== Countermeasures and sensors ===
As built, the decoy system comprises Two BAE Systems Shield Mark 2 decoy launchers which fire chaff to 2 kilometres (1.2 mi) and infrared rockets to 169 metres (185 yd) in distraction, confusion and centroid seduction modes. The torpedo decoy is the AN/SLQ-25A Nixie towed acoustic decoy from Argon ST. The ship's radar warning receiver, the CANEWS (Canadian Electronic Warfare System), SLQ-501, and the radar jammer, SLQ-505, were developed by Thorn and Lockheed Martin Canada.

Two Thales Nederland (formerly Signaal) SPG-503 (STIR 1.8) fire control radars are installed one on the roof of the bridge and one on the raised radar platform immediately forward of the helicopter hangar. The ship is also fitted with Raytheon AN/SPS-49(V)5 long-range active air search radar operating at C and D bands, Ericsson HC150 Sea Giraffe medium-range air and surface search radar operating at G and H bands, and Kelvin Hughes Type 1007 I-band navigation radar. The sonar suite includes the CANTASS Canadian Towed Array and GD-C AN/SQS-510 hull mounted sonar and incorporates an acoustic range prediction system. The sonobuoy processing system is the GD-C AN/UYS-503.

=== Modernization ===
The Halifax class underwent a modernization program, known as the Halifax Class Modernization (HCM) program, in order to update the frigates' capabilities in combatting modern smaller, faster and more mobile threats. This involved upgrading the command and control, radar, communications, electronic warfare and armament systems. Further improvements, such as modifying the vessel to accommodate the new Sikorsky CH-148 Cyclone helicopter and satellite links will be done separately from the main Frigate Equipment Life Extension (FELEX) program.

The FELEX program comprised upgrading the combat systems integration to CMS330. The SPS-49 2D long range air search radar was replaced by the Thales Nederland SMART-S Mk 2 E/F-band 3D surveillance radar, and the two STIR 1.8 fire control radars were replaced by a pair of Saab Ceros 200 re-control radars. A Telephonics IFF Mode 5/S interrogator was installed and the Elisra NS9003A-V2HC ESM system replaced the SLQ-501 CANEWS. An IBM multi-link (Link 11, Link 16 and Link 22 enabled) datalink processing system was installed along with two Raytheon Anschütz Pathfinder Mk II navigation radars. Furthermore, Rheinmetall's Multi-Ammunition Soft kill System (MASS), known as MASS DUERAS was introduced to replace the Plessey Shield decoy system. The existing 57 mm Mk 2 guns were upgraded to the Mk 3 standard and the Harpoon missiles were improved to Block II levels, the Phalanx was upgraded to Block 1B and the obsolete Sea Sparrow system was replaced by the Evolved Sea Sparrow Missile.

== Service history ==
Charlottetown's keel was laid down on 18 December 1993 by Saint John Shipbuilding Ltd. at Saint John, New Brunswick. The vessel was launched on 1 October 1994 and commissioned into the Canadian Forces on 9 September 1995 at Charlottetown, carrying the hull classification symbol FFH 339.

In 1996, the frigate sailed to join NATO's Standing Naval Force Atlantic (STANAVFORLANT) and performed a series of naval exercises with Eastern European nations. In 1997, after becoming the first Canadian warship to pass beneath the Confederation Bridge, the vessel participated in US naval exercises. In 1998, Charlottetown performed another stint with STANAVFORLANT beginning in February, replacing sister ship Toronto.

In January 2001, Charlottetown sailed to the Persian Gulf to join the USS Harry S. Truman Carrier Battle Group, enforcing sanctions against Iraq. Following Canada's entry into the War in Afghanistan, Charlottetown was part of the initial naval task force sent to the Arabian Sea. Composed of Iroquois, Charlottetown and Preserver, the task force sailed from Halifax, Nova Scotia on 17 October 2001 arrived in theatre on 20 November. Charlottetown was incorporated into a US amphibious ready group escorting United States Marine Corps troop transports near Pakistan. Charlottetown returned to Halifax on 27 April 2002.

In 2008 the frigate made significant narcotics interceptions. A dhow was caught loaded with four tonnes of hashish, close to Pakistani waters. The impounded vessel and crew were handed over to the Pakistan Coast Guard.

=== Mediterranean deployments ===
On 2 March 2011, Charlottetown left its home port of Halifax to join the NATO-led air-sea Operation Unified Protector during the 2011 Libyan civil war. Charlottetown worked in conjunction with an American carrier battle group led by the aircraft carrier USS Enterprise. The stated mission was to help restore peace, evacuate Canadian citizens in Libya and provide humanitarian relief. On 18 March the Canadian government expanded the mission by announcing that HMCS Charlottetown, in addition to six CF-18 fighter aircraft and two CC-177 transport aircraft, would constitute Canada's contribution to the enforcement of United Nations Security Council Resolution 1973, aimed to protect Libya's civilian population (Operation Mobile).

By 21 March, the Canadian Broadcasting Corporation reported that Charlottetown was patrolling the waters off north Libya. On 12 May, the frigate engaged several small boats involved in an attack on the port city of Misrata. Later that month on 30 May, the frigate came under fire from a dozen BM-21 rockets while patrolling off the Libyan coast, but no damage or injuries were reported. In July 2011, HMCS Vancouver relieved Charlottetown, which returned to Halifax.

Charlottetown departed Halifax on 8 January 2012 to join the NATO-led mission Operation Active Endeavor. The mission was an anti-terrorism deployment to the Mediterranean Sea. At the time of departure Commander Wade Carter said to the media that there were no plans for Charlottetown to intervene in the conflict in Syria. The frigate was sent to relieve HMCS Vancouver.

=== Maritime security operations ===
Charlottetown transited the Suez Canal on 23 April 2012 to join Combined Task Force 150, conducting counter-terrorism operations in the Arabian Sea. She returned to Halifax on 11 September 2012. While on deployment, Charlottetown was the test ship for the unmanned aerial vehicle Boeing Insitu ScanEagle. During her service in the Arabian Sea one of the ScanEagle UAVs, which had been deployed from the ship, was lost due to engine failure. The navy later denied that it had been found by Iran, which had captured a ScanEagle drone around the same time. The vessel completed the FELEX modernisation in June 2014.

On 27 June 2016 Charlottetown sailed from Halifax to join NATO's Operation Reassurance in the Mediterranean Sea. While deployed overseas, twenty members of the crew contracted hand, foot, and mouth disease. In October, Charlottetown took part in the multinational naval exercise Joint Warrior off the coast of Scotland. The vessel returned to Canada on 13 January 2017 and conducted a full crew change.

Charlottetown re-deployed to Europe on 8 August 2017, relieving sister ship HMCS St. John's. Charlottetown joined Standing NATO Maritime Group One (SNMG1) in support of Operation Reassurance. During the deployment, Charlottetown patrolled the Baltic Sea in August taking part in exercise Northern Coast, on completion she transited south taking part in the NATO naval exercise Brilliant Mariner in the Mediterranean Sea in September–October. Charlottletown returned to Halifax on 19 January 2018, having visited eleven ports during the deployment. In August, Charlottetown and HMCS Kingston departed Halifax to take part in Operation Nanook, travelling to Iqaluit, Nunavut and Nuuk, Greenland.

In early 2024, Charlottetown sailed to take part in the NATO military exercise Steadfast Defender, the largest NATO military exercise in 36 years. After returning from Steadfast Defender, the frigate departed in June to become the flagship of Standing NATO Maritime Group 2 (SNMG2) in the Mediterranean Sea.

In February 2026, Charlottetown set sail from Halifax to take part in UN Operation Neon, for enforcement of maritime sanctions, as well as CAF Operation Horizon, to promote allied cooperation in the Indo-Pacific. In March, the ship participated in the Royal Australian Navy's Exercise Kakadu Fleet Review in Sydney Harbour.
