= Ali Sharif al-Rifi =

Former commander of the Libyan Air Force

Major General Ali Sharif al-Rifi
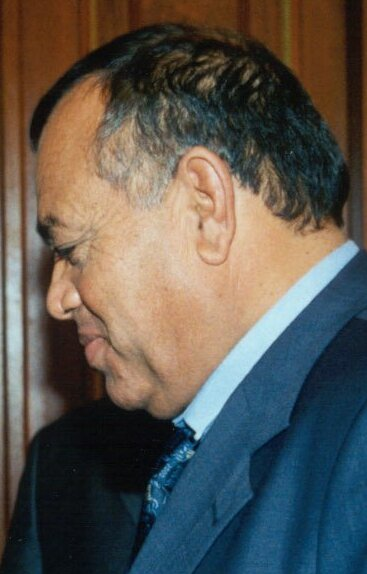
- al-Rifi in November 2002
- Born: 1946; Libya
- Died: December 30, 2023 (aged 76–77); Cairo, Egypt
- Military career
- Allegiance: Libyan Arab Jamahiriya
- Branch: Libyan Air Force
- Service years: 1965—2011
- Rank: Major General
- Conflicts: Toyota War; Libyan Civil War

Major General Ali Sharif al-Rifi (Arabic: علي الشريف الريفي; died 30 December 2023) was the commander of the Libyan Air Force until 2011 when his air force was destroyed by the NATO attacks during the Libyan Civil War. Subsequently, he was reported to be living in Niger before returning to Libya.

== Chadian–Libyan conflict ==
During the latter parts of the Chadian–Libyan conflict, Colonel al-Rifi was in command of Libyan troop deployments from his base at Kufra in the south of Libya.

== Senior Libyan Air Force commander ==
In 1991, Ali Sharif al-Rifi, named as Colonel Rifi Ali al-Sharif, was listed on the Fact Sheet which provided additional information on the bombing of Pan Am Flight 103 issued with the United States District Court for the District of Columbia indictment against Abdelbaset al-Megrahi and Lamin Khalifah Fhimah in the case of the Lockerbie bombing. Ali Sharif al-Rifi was described as having a prominent role in Libya's procurement effort and as having reportedly attempted to assist al-Megrahi in his attempt to acquire US aircraft via Benin. The Fact Sheet did not state that Ali Sharif al-Rifi had been involved in the Lockerbie bombing.

During the Libyan Civil War, al-Rifi was the commander of the Libyan Air Force until his air force was destroyed by the NATO attacks.

== Escape to Niger ==
After the pro-Gaddafi forces lost control of Tripoli, Ali Sharif al-Rifi was reported to be in the southern Libyan town of Murzuk before fleeing to the neighbouring country of Niger, arriving in the northern city of Agadez on 8 September and taking up residence in the Étoile du Ténéré hotel. Marou Amadou the Nigerien justice minister confirmed the reports and stated that Ali Sharif al-Rifi, along with Gaddafi loyalist Tuareg General Ali Kanna, was in Agadez and was "being well guarded" even though he was not in a Nigerien government building. By 14 September it was being reported that al-Rifi had relocated to the Nigerian capital Niamey and taken up residence in the Villa du Conseil de l'Entente along with Gaddafi's son Al-Saadi and Mansour Dhao, Gaddafi's security chief. The Villa du Conseil de l'Entente has been described as a hillside collection of bungalows with high walls. In 2017, he was reported to have returned to his home in the Libyan town of Waddan.

He later travelled to Cairo in Egypt where in 2023, al-Rifi died from an illness.
