= ASARS-2 =

Type of aircraft radar system

The Advanced Synthetic Aperture Radar System-2 (ASARS-2) is the radar system mounted on some variants of the Lockheed U-2 reconnaissance aircraft.

The ASARS-2 radar was originally developed in the early 1980s by Hughes Aircraft, which was acquired by Raytheon in the late 1990s. It is capable of detecting and accurately locating both stationary and moving ground targets; target information is transmitted via a wideband data link to a ground station. The radar is capable of producing extremely high resolution images at long range.

ASARS-2 was used extensively during Operation Desert Storm for target location and battle damage assessment. It has also been used to survey damage after various domestic disasters, including floods along the Mississippi River and the 1994 Northridge earthquake.

In the late 1990s, the ASARS Improvement Program (AIP) incorporated several performance and supportability enhancements into the system. Making extensive use of commercial off-the-shelf technology, the AIP redesign increased on-board processing capability and upgraded the data link. The first of these ASARS-2A radars was delivered in 2001.

Some features and technologies from the ASARS-2A system have been incorporated into the Raytheon Sentinel developed as the RAF's Airborne STand-Off Radar (ASTOR) aircraft.
