= Operation Newcombe =

British military operation in Mali

- Part of the Mali War, the Insurgency in the Maghreb and the war on terror
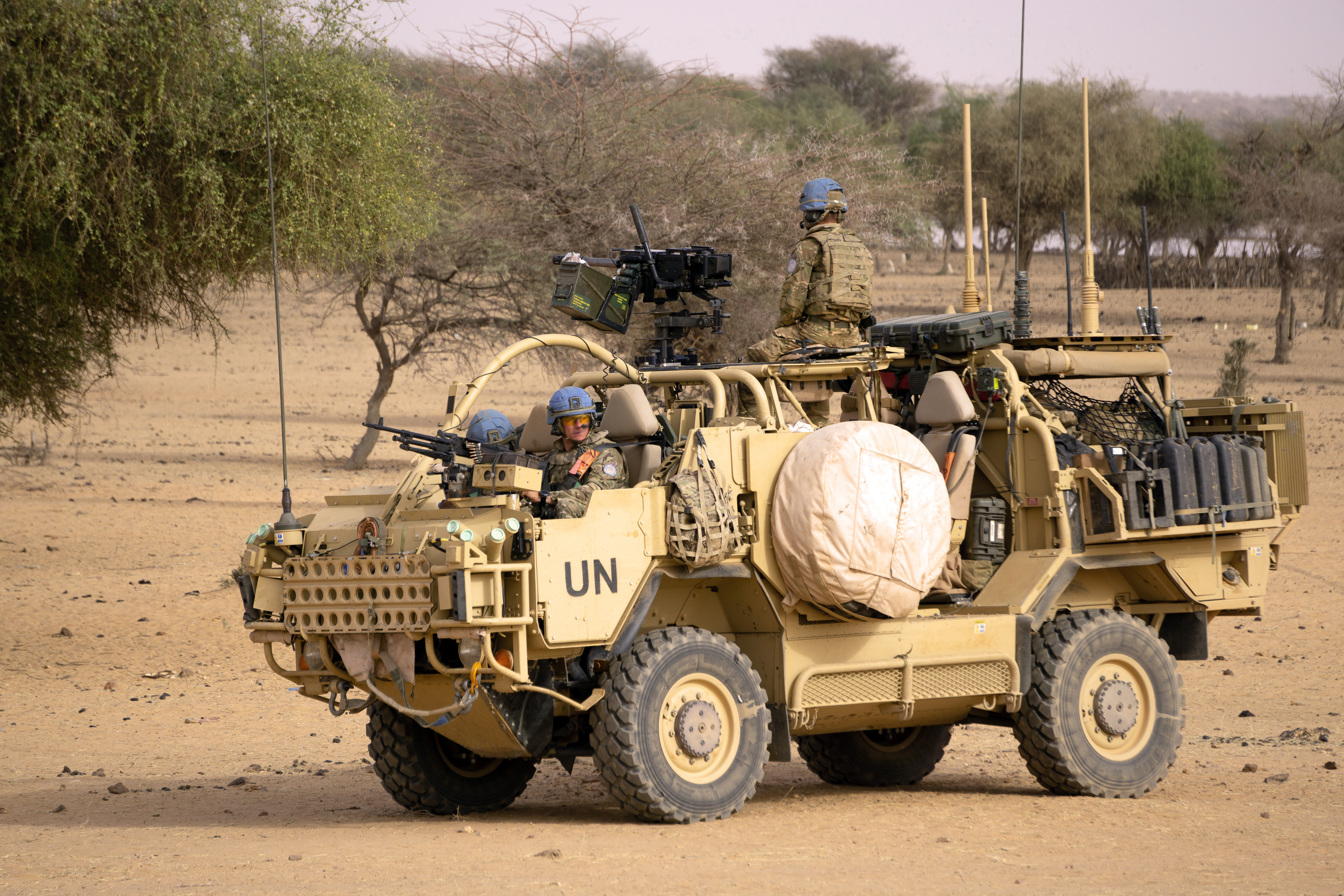
- British UN peacekeepers on patrol
- Location: Mali
- Objective: Provide non-combat military support to French forces and EUTM Mali.
- Date: 13 January 2013 – 14 November 2022
- Executed by: United Kingdom

Operation Newcombe was the code name for two separate and concurrent British non-combat military operations in Mali. One operation involved logistical and airlift support for the French-led Operation Barkhane (previously Operation Serval), whilst the other encompassed peacekeeping in support of the United Nations Multidimensional Integrated Stabilization Mission in Mali (MINUSMA). The operation was first launched on 13 January 2013 by Prime Minister David Cameron and initially involved strategic airlift and aerial reconnaissance. It later saw the deployment of a detachment of Chinook transport helicopters, before shifting its emphasis to UN peacekeeping in 2020. The operation ultimately drew to a close on 14 November 2022 due to political instability in the country.

== Background ==
In 2012, amid unprecedented civil unrest, rebel groups — including Islamist militants with links to Al-Qaeda — began to violently take control of northern parts of Mali. The United Nations Security Council subsequently authorised a French-backed resolution for African-led military action to retake control. In January 2013, Ansar Dine Islamists ran the Malian Army out of the city of Konna, which is situated 600 kilometres (370 mi) northeast of the capital Bamako. Following a request for military assistance from Mali, France launched Operation Serval and began targeting Islamist militants in the north of the country. France requested assistance from other countries, including the United Kingdom, and following a phone call between British Prime Minister David Cameron and French President François Hollande, the UK agreed to contribute "very limited strategic tactical support" with no personnel deployed in a combat role.

== Deployment ==
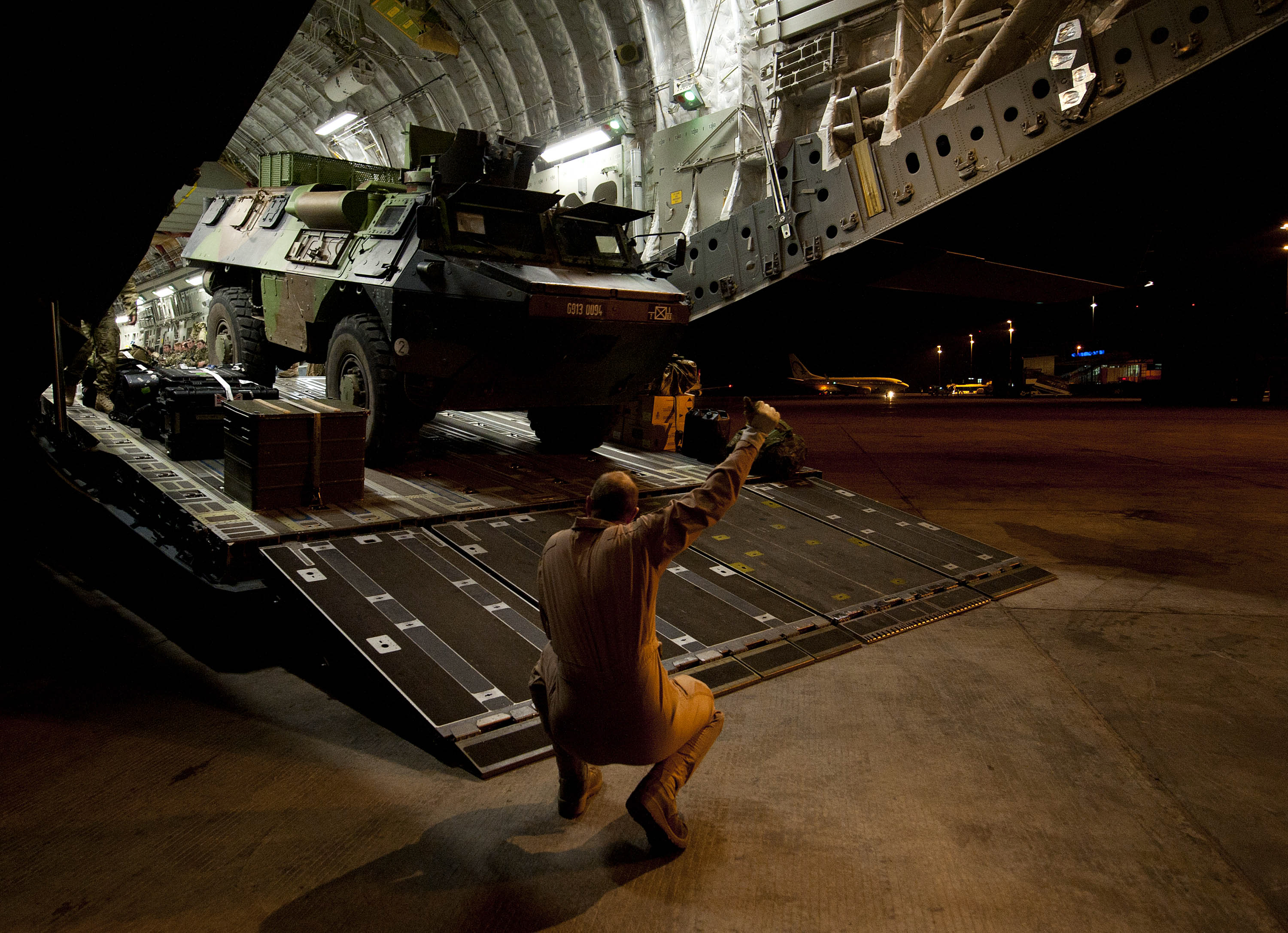
A French armoured vehicle being unloaded from an RAF C-17 in Bamako, Mali

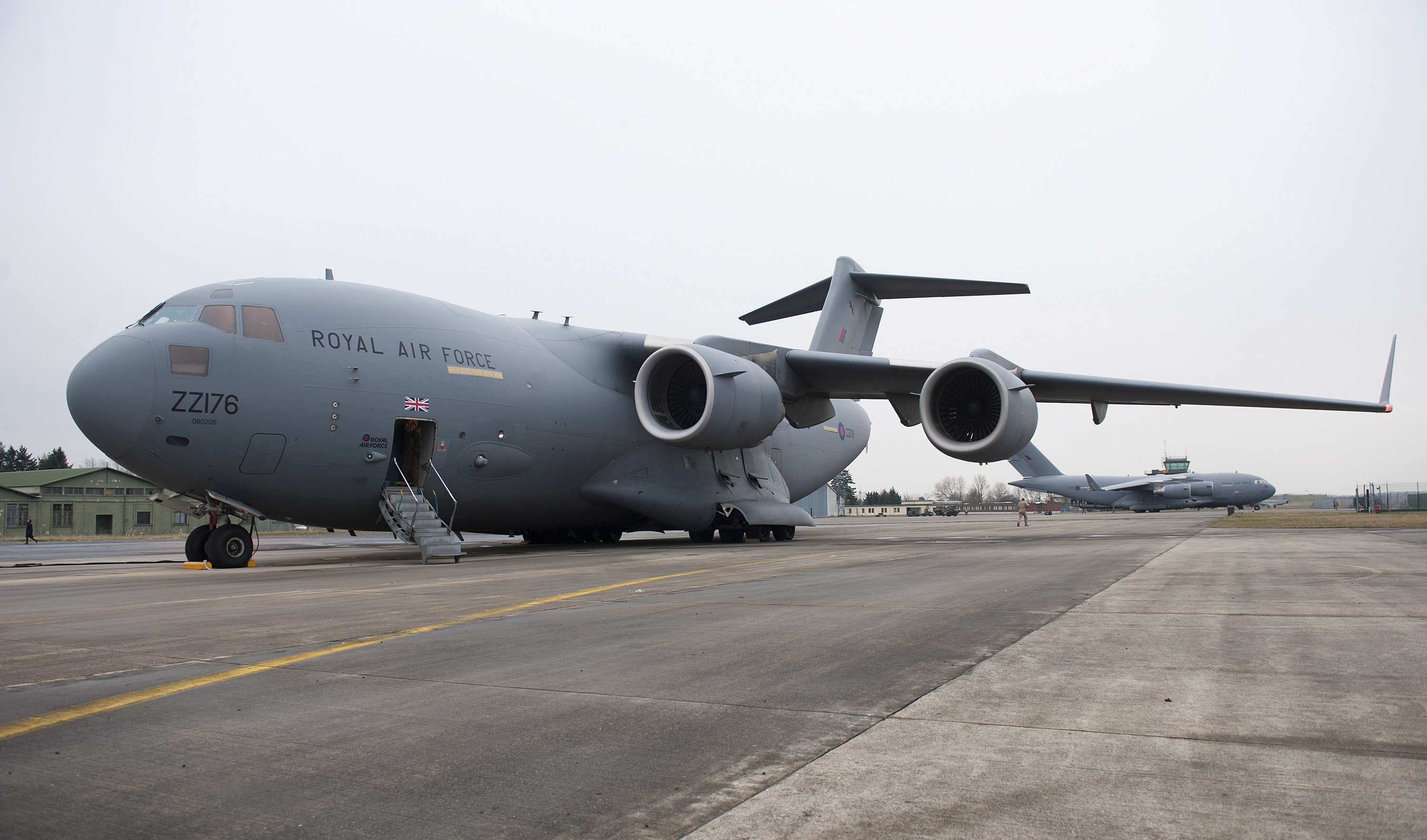
Two Royal Air Force C-17 Globemaster III transport aircraft prior to the embarkation of French equipment

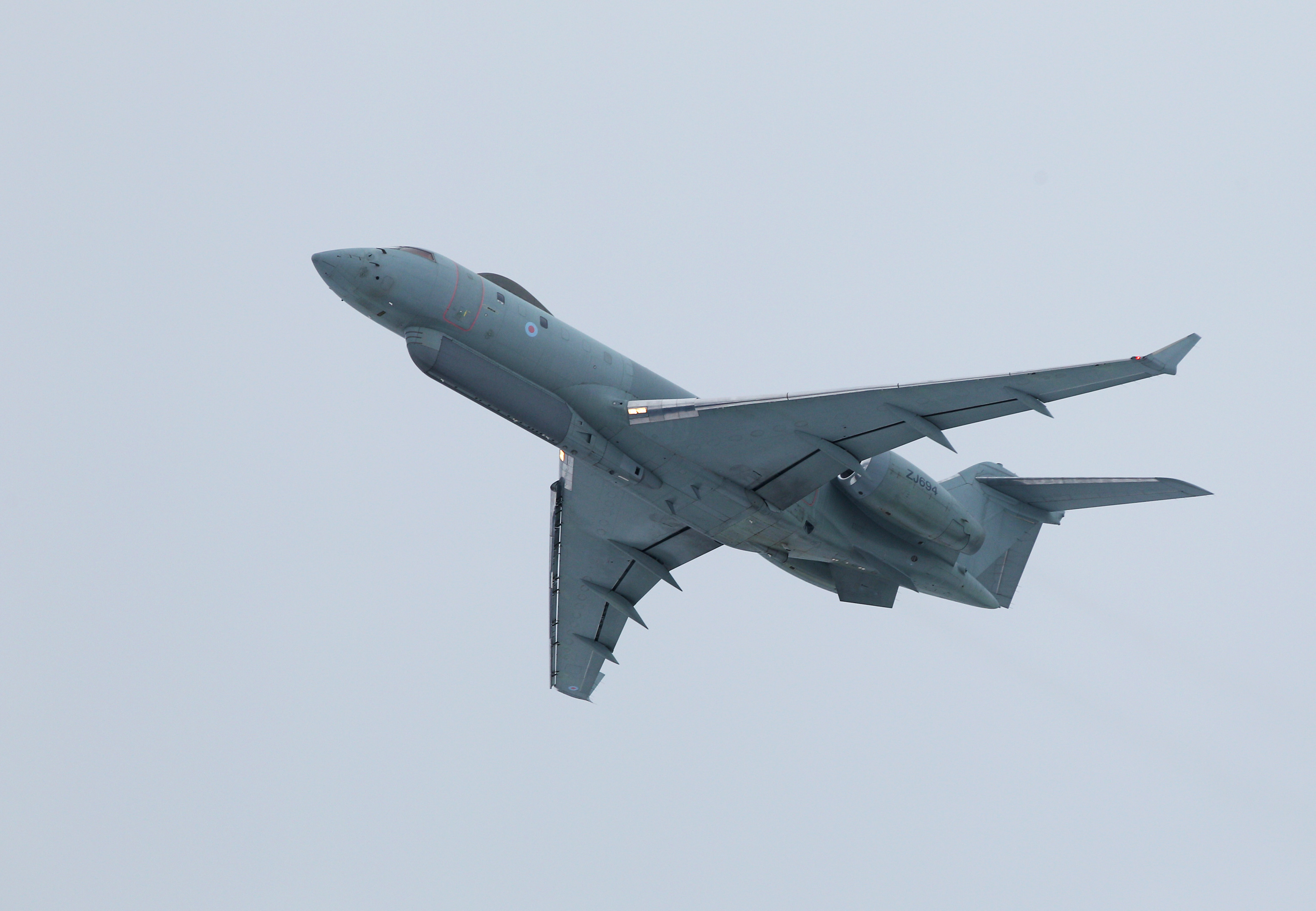
An RAF Sentinel R1 surveillance aircraft departing for Mali

=== 2013–2020 ===
On 13 January 2013, two Royal Air Force C-17 Globemaster III transport aircraft from No. 99 Squadron RAF took off from RAF Brize Norton en route to Évreux-Fauville Air Base in France. The aircraft were loaded with French armoured vehicles and other military equipment before airlifting them to French forces in Bamako, Mali's capital. Defence Secretary Philip Hammond later announced the UK would also deploy a Sentinel R1 surveillance aircraft. The aircraft, from No. 5 Squadron RAF, was based in Dakar, Senegal alongside 100 support personnel. In four months, it had flown for a total of 697 hours across 66 sorties and had delivered 100 intelligence reports to French commanders. It returned to the UK on 22 May 2013.

On 29 January 2013, 330 British military personnel were deployed to West Africa in a training role, including 40 destined for Mali in support of the EU Training Mission in Mali (EUTM Mali). In addition to assisting French and EU forces, the UK also assisted the African-led International Support Mission to Mali (AFISMA) with the deployment of a 200-strong military training team and RAF C-17 transportation flights.

In 2016, the UK pledged to continue its C-17 support on a monthly basis.

In 2018, No. 1310 Flight RAF, consisting three RAF Chinook transport helicopters and up to 60 support personnel, were deployed to Mali to assist French operations. A C-17 was used to transport supplies necessary for the deployment, which landed at Gao International Airport. In November 2019, the aircraft were involved in the response effort following the 2019 Ménaka mid-air collision which killed 13 French soldiers — the largest loss of French service personnel in nearly four decades.

In 2019, the UK announced its intention to deploy 250 military personnel to Gao in 2020 as peacekeepers in support of United Nations Multidimensional Integrated Stabilization Mission in Mali (MINUSMA). In April, Sierra Troop, 244 Signal Squadron (Air Support), Royal Signals arrived in Gao via an RAF A400M Atlas transport aircraft to provide information and communication services (ICS) support. The troop constructed a permanent communications shelter with the assistance of the Royal Engineers.

=== 2020–2022 ===
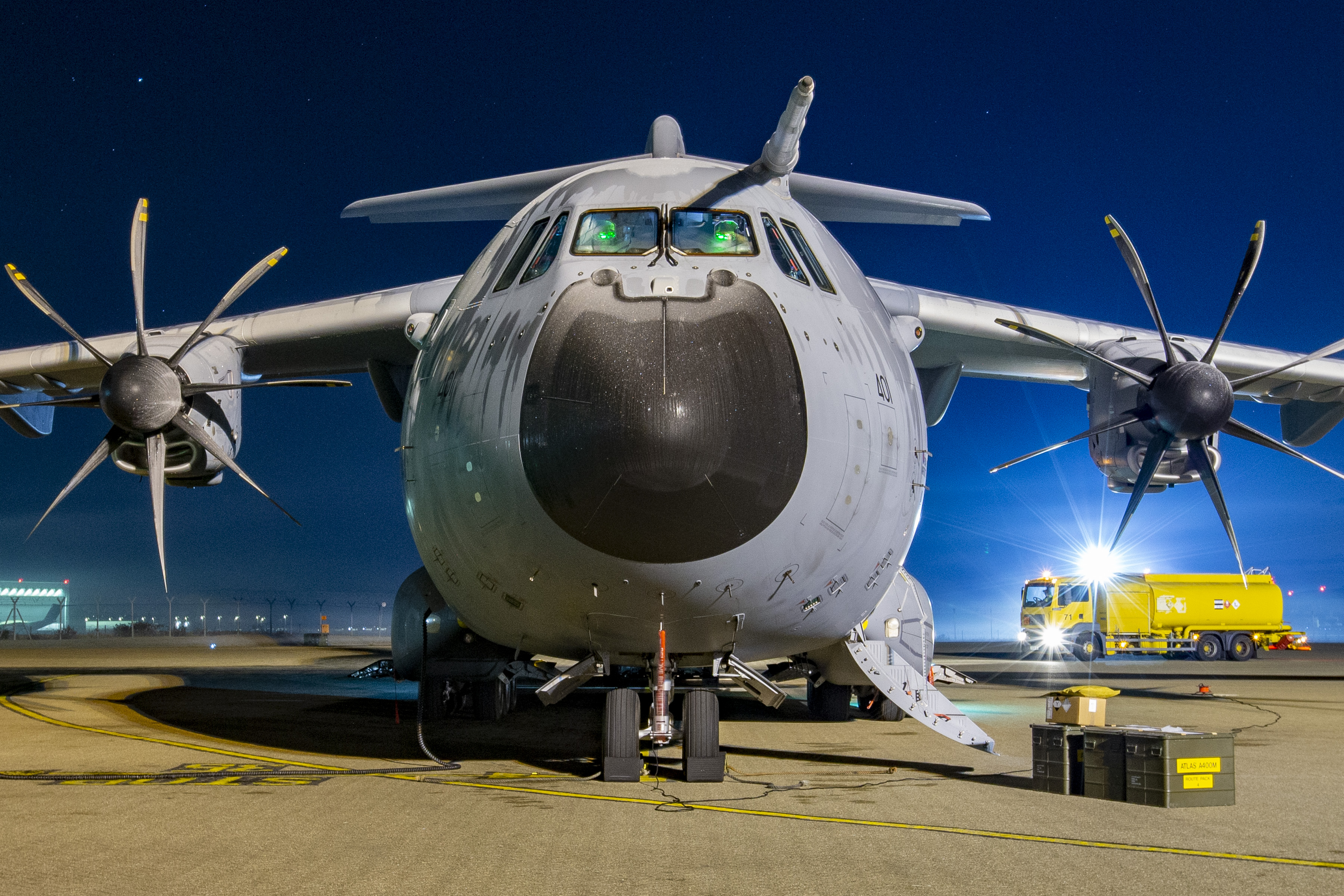
An A400M Atlas preparing to leave RAF Brize Norton for Mali

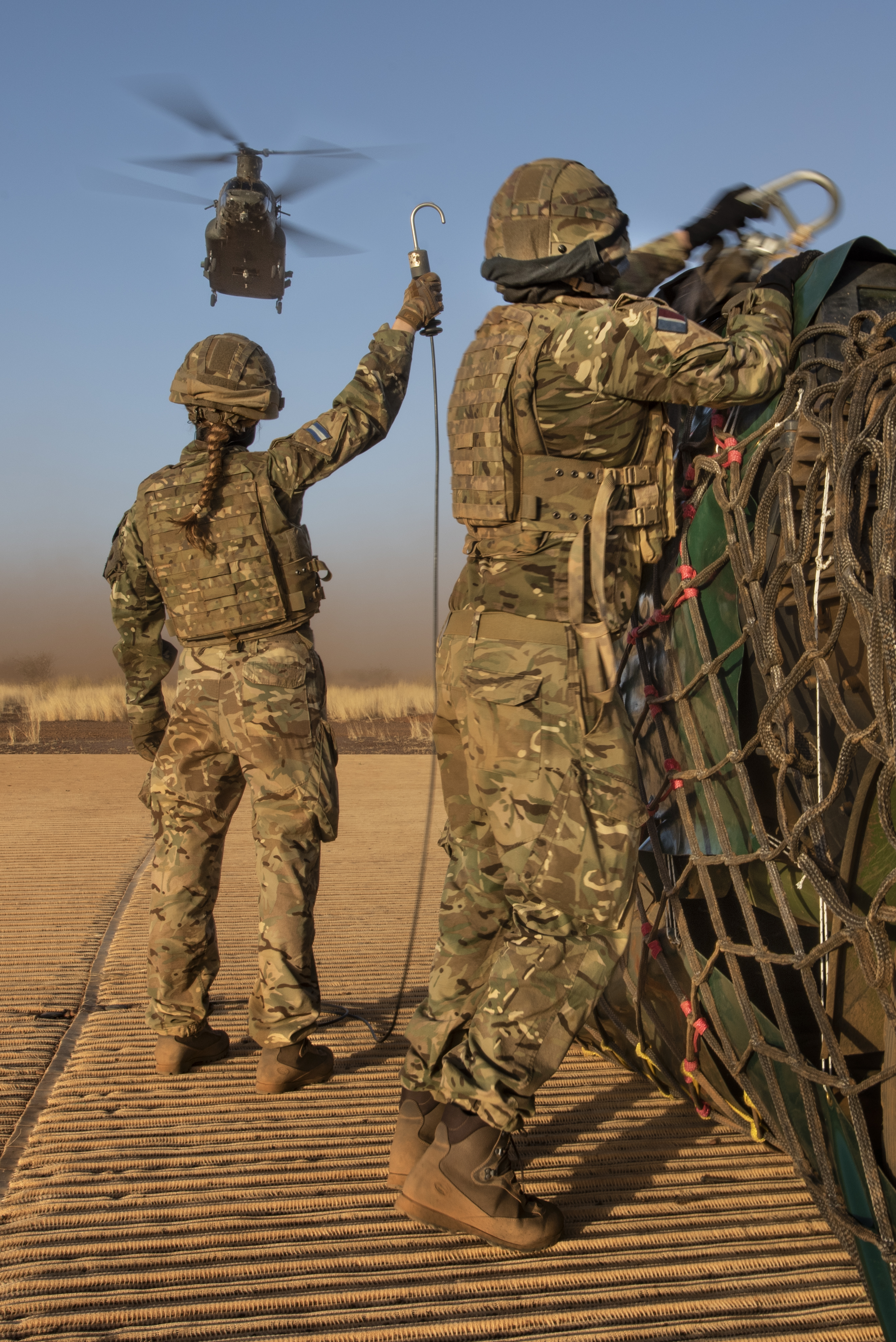
A Mobile Air Ops Team (MAOT) signalling to a Chinook helicopter in Mali

By May 2020, the Chinooks had passed 2,000 flying hours, moved over 1,000 tonnes of freight and transported 12,000 passengers. The aircraft were flown by No. 18 Squadron RAF, and No. 27 Squadron RAF and had their deployment extended in June. The COVID-19 pandemic, which began in 2019, had not impacted operations. Additionally, the Light Dragoons and The Royal Anglian Regiment prepared to deploy as the 250-strong peacekeeping force announced previously in support of MINUSMA. They formed a Long Range Reconnaissance Group (LRRG) to carry out long-range reconnaissance patrols and intelligence-gathering for the UN, whilst operating separately from the Chinook contingent. Lockheed Martin Desert Hawk unmanned aerial vehicles were also deployed.

During a four-month tour between May–July 2020, British Chinook helicopters took part in several intensive operations, including a series of company-sized airlifts of French Army units. One phase of the operation saw a Chinook flying during the night alongside French Caiman helicopters to insert over 130 troops for a clearance patrol before returning them back to Gao 36 hours later.

In November 2020, 300 British troops from the Light Dragoons and the Royal Anglian Regiment arrived in Mali to undertake their MINUSMA peacekeeping mission. Arriving via an RAF Atlas aircraft, the troops began operating out of a British section of a UN camp in Gao, named Camp Bagnold in honour of the desert explorer and soldier Brigadier Ralph Alger Bagnold. As part of their mission, the troops provided a reconnaissance capability, carrying out patrols and gathering intelligence for the local population. Additionally, the three Chinook helicopters and 100 logistics personnel remained committed to the operation.

In July 2021, British Chinook helicopters helped recover two French Air Force pilots after they were forced to eject from their Mirage 2000 fighter jet over central Mali. The helicopters transported 60 French troops to secure the crash site and recover both pilots, both of whom survived.

In October 2021, whilst on a UN peacekeeping patrol from Gao to Ménaka, British troops came under fire from two armed attackers. The troops returned fire and killed both attackers whilst sustaining no casualties. It was the first time British troops had killed armed fighters in combat since the end of combat operations in Afghanistan in 2014.

=== Withdrawal ===
On 14 November 2022, the UK announced a withdrawal of its forces from Mali due to political instability. There had been two coups in three years with the last one resulting in a military junta in May 2021. Relations between Mali and Western powers subsequently deteriorated as the junta resisted Western demands for an immediate transfer back to civilian rule. The junta also sought the support of the Wagner Group, a Russian paramilitary organisation which has been accused of human rights abuses and war crimes. France announced a full withdrawal of its forces on 17 February 2022, citing "multiple obstructions" by the Malian government, which was completed by 16 August 2022. British forces remained in the country in support of UN peacekeeping duties until 14 November, when Defence Minister James Heappey announced a withdrawal. In Parliament, he stated: "Two coups in three years have undermined international efforts to advance peace". He added: "[The Malian government] began working with the Russian mercenary group Wagner and actively sought to interfere with the work of both the French-led and UN missions. [...] This government cannot deploy our nation's military to provide security when the host country's government is not willing to work with us to deliver lasting stability and security".

== See also ==
- Operation Turus - A similar British military operation to support Nigeria's fight against Boko Haram
