= Naval Air Station Sigonella =

Italian Air Force Base

- Base aerea di Sigonella
- Lentini, Sicily, Italy in Italy
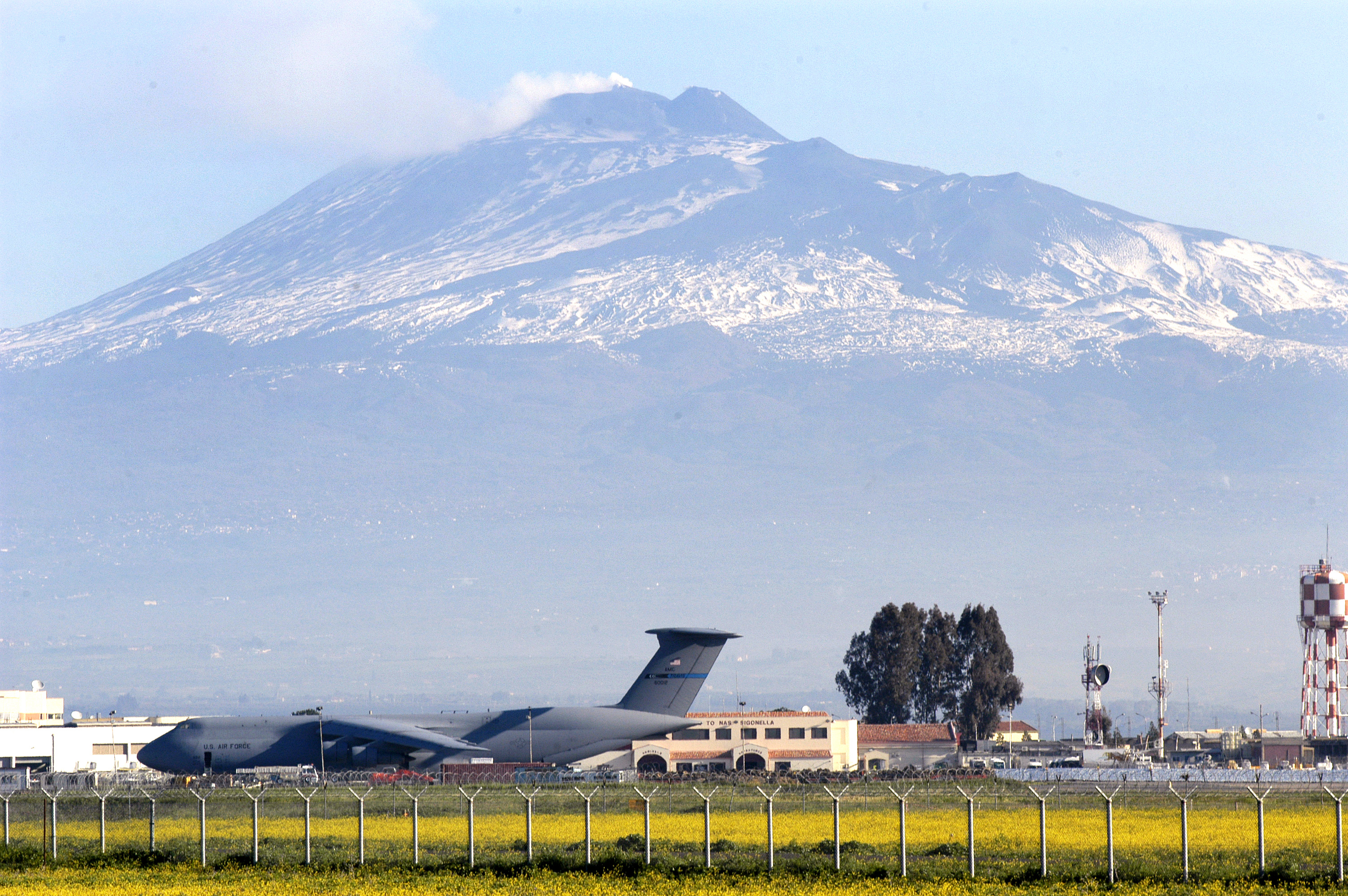
- A C-5 Galaxy of the US Air Force at NAS Sigonella, against the backdrop of nearby Mount Etna

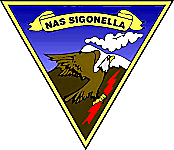

Site information
- Type: Italian Air Force base with US Navy Naval Air Station
- Owner: Italian Ministry of Defence
- Operator: Italian Air Force (AMI); US Navy (USN)
- Controlled by: Support and Special Forces Command (AMI); Commander, Navy Region Europe, Africa, Central (USN)
- Condition: Operational
- Website: Official website

Location
- Location in Sicily
- Coordinates: 37°24′06″N 014°55′20″E

Site history
- Built: 1957 – 1959
- In use: 1959 – present

Garrison information
- Current commander: Colonel Stefano Spreafico (ITAF); Captain Daniel “DMart” Martins (USN)

Airfield information
- Identifiers: IATA: NSY, ICAO: LICZ, WMO: 164590
- Elevation: 24 metres (79 ft) AMSL
Runways
| Direction | Length and surface |
|---|---|
| 10R/28L | 2,462 metres (8,077 ft) Asphalt |
| 10L/28R | 2,442 metres (8,012 ft) Asphalt |

Naval Air Station (NAS) Sigonella (IATA: NSY, ICAO: LICZ) is an Italian Air Force base (Italian: Aeroporto "Cosimo Di Palma" di Sigonella), and a U.S. Navy installation at Italian Air Force Base Sigonella in Lentini, Sicily, Italy. The whole NAS is a tenant of the Italian Air Force, which has the military and the administrative control. It serves as an Italian base for the 41º Stormo Antisom (41st Antisubmarine Warfare Wing). NAS Sigonella acts also as a landlord to more than 40 other U.S. commands and activities. It is located 15 kilometres (9 mi) west and 11 km (7 mi) south of the city of Catania, and some 40 km (25 mi) south of Mount Etna.

The NAS is located in the western part of the large airport structure, while the Italian military base is located in the eastern part. Because of its location near the center of the Mediterranean Sea, NASSIG is well-placed to support operations by the U.S. 6th Fleet, other U.S. military units, and U.S. allies and coalition partners.

Among the aircraft that fly from this island base are Italian Air Force ATR 72MP (which replaced the Breguet Br.1150 Atlantic in 2017) and United States Air Force C-130, C-17, and C-5 airlifters, KC-135 and KC-10 tankers and U.S. Navy P-8 Poseidons, C-2 Greyhounds, and C-40A Clippers.

It is one of the most frequently used stops for U.S. airlift aircraft bound from the continental United States to Southwest Asia and the Indian Ocean.

NAS Sigonella has the best claim to be a hub of U.S. naval air operations in the Mediterranean. The base command is the landlord to more than 40 other U.S. units. Among the largest are a rotating P-8A patrol squadron; a Naval Computer and Telecommunications Station; and a U.S. Naval Hospital. The hospital was built in 1992. Previously, there was only a clinic and the closest U.S. Naval Hospital was in Naples. Sigonella is home to more than 4,000 troops, civilian personnel, and family members.

NAS Sigonella is the Navy's second largest security command, second only to that located at Naval Support Activity Bahrain. NAS Sigonella also has a large support of security personnel from NR NSF Sigonella, a Navy Reserve command based in NRC Detroit at Selfridge ANGB, Michigan.

The Naval Air Station comprises two sections: NAS I was the site of the original U.S. base but is now a support facility, and NAS II which includes the runways, operations, and most tenant commands. NAS I also contains the Navy Exchange and Commissary, the school, and some homes, mainly for the commodore of Task Force 67, the air station commanding officer, the air station executive officer, and commanding officers of tenant activities. NAS I also is host to other facilities, mainly for entertainment. NAS II is now only used as a service base.

Sigonella is based also on the NATO Intelligence, Surveillance, and Reconnaissance Force (NISRF) with five RQ-4D Phoenix remotely piloted aircraft and the associated European-sourced ground command and control stations.

== History ==
The idea of a U.S. naval airbase on Sigonella arose in the early 1950s, when operations with U.S. Navy P2V Neptunes outgrew their base at Hal Far, Malta. The United States Navy obtained NATO backing for a base on Sicily. Italy made land available under a temporary agreement signed on June 25, 1957. Six days later, Landing Ship Tanks (LSTs) began to deliver equipment from the Malta base.

Ground was broken in September, and construction on the administrative area at NAF I was started in 1958. It was built on top of an airfield where damaged fighters and bombers of the German Air Force had once landed during the World War II. The first Americans arrived for work at Sigonella in March 1959—six months before any buildings were ready—and so worked for six months in Catania at a large warehouse complex called Magazzino Generale (General Warehouse), which is opposite the cemetery on the right side of the street as one enters Catania from the base.

Naval Air Facility, Sigonella, was formally established June 15, 1959, commanded by Captain Walter J. Frazier. By the end of August 1959, the NAF II airfield was available for daylight flights under visual flight rules (VFR); 24 flights were logged by 31 August.

One of Sigonella's first buildings was its vector (pest) control center, where rat poison was stored. The Army Corps of Engineers next used the building for their offices, later sharing it with Special Services, or what is now called Morale, Welfare and Recreation (MWR). Around 1966, the American Forces Network came to Sigonella and joined Special Services, which soon moved out, leaving the building to the broadcasters.

NAF Sigonella's first flood occurred in mid-September 1959. The Dittaino Bridge between NAF I and NAF II was under six feet of water on September 20 and all traffic had to go through Catania. Power outages accompanied the floods.

In 1965 the Italian Air Force sited at Sigonella the 41st Antisubmarine Warfare Wing (86st Gruppo and 88st Gruppo) with mixed crews from the Air Force and Navy.

In the 1980s, "Naval Air Facility" Sigonella was redesignated as a "Naval Air Station".

In 1983 the base was named after World War II pilot Captain Cosimo Di Palma (it), who was shot down by the Luftwaffe while on a mission with the Italian Co-belligerent Air Force and was honored with the Gold Medal of Military Valor.

=== The Sigonella crisis ===
On the night of October 10, 1985, there were tense hours on NAS II when the Italian Carabinieri, Italian Air Force, and the US Army's Delta Force came close to firing upon one another after US Navy F-14 Tomcat fighters intercepted an Egyptian Boeing 737 airliner carrying the hijackers of the Italian cruise ship, the Achille Lauro, which had been commandeered by members of the PLO on 7 October. The hijackers had killed a Jewish American Leon Klinghoffer. The F-14s instructed the Egyptian plane to land at Sigonella where the Americans had planned to take the hijackers into custody. The Italian Prime Minister Bettino Craxi instead claimed the hijackers were under Italian jurisdiction. The Italian authorities refused to allow the Navy SEALs to board the plane, threatening to open fire on the Americans had they attempted to do so. The ensuing stand-off lasted throughout the night until President Ronald Reagan ordered the Americans to stand down. The hijackers were eventually tried and sentenced by an Italian court.

=== Operation Hot Rock ===
In April 1992, Naval Air Station Sigonella played a key role in Operation Hot Rock, a joint U.S.–Italian effort to divert lava flows from the erupting Mount Etna that threatened the town of Zafferana Etnea. Heavy-lift helicopters based at Sigonella, including U.S. Marine Corps CH-53E Super Stallion aircraft from HMM-266 and U.S. Navy helicopters from HC-4, were used to transport and drop massive concrete blocks into the lava channels as part of the diversion strategy. The base served as the primary staging point for U.S. aircraft and crews during the operation, which became one of the most notable examples of military assets being deployed in support of civil protection during a natural disaster.

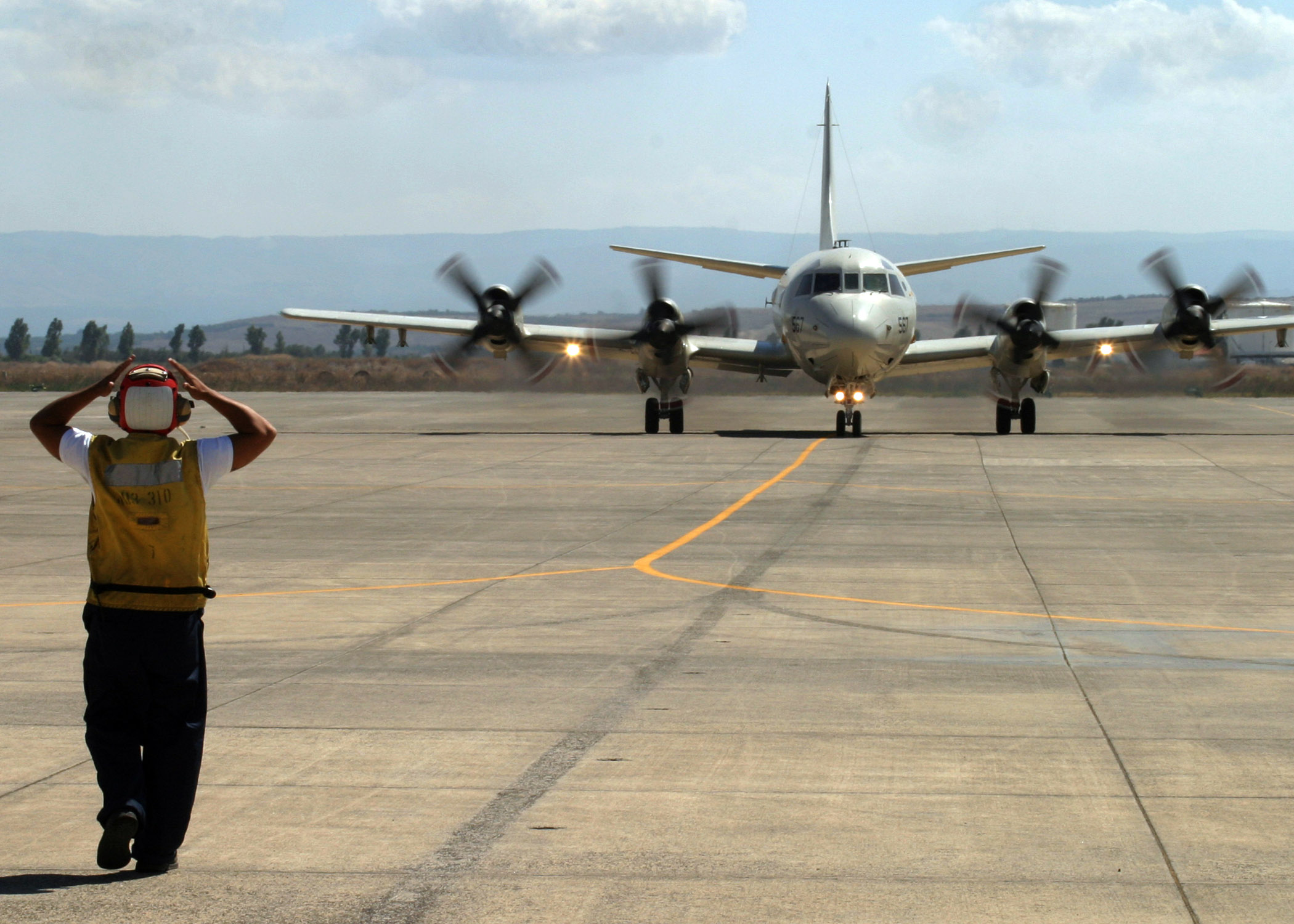
A taxiway on NAS Sigonella

In late 1985, work crews belonging to NMCB 133 were repairing and installing sidewalks in the housing area at NAS I when they uncovered a small stockpile of Luftwaffe antiaircraft ammunition. The stockpile had belonged to an antiaircraft position that had been buried during raids in the Allied invasion of 1943.

On April 1, 2004, the Defense Logistics Agency (DLA) opened Defense Depot Sigonella Italy on NAS II to serve as a supply base for the Mediterranean. DLA also provides fuel and property disposal from NAS II.

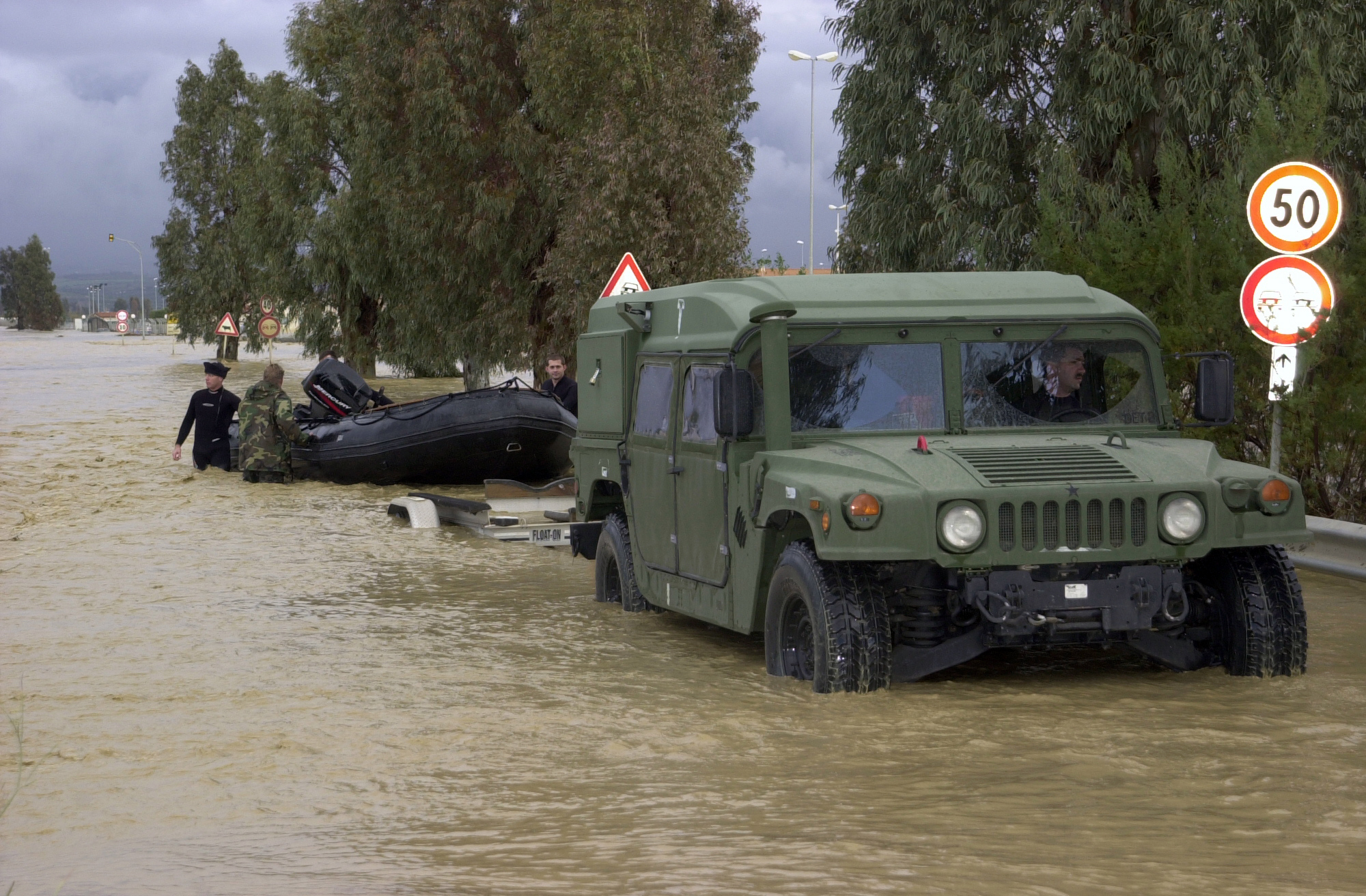
NAS Sigonella during flooding in December 2005.

Sigonella suffered its second major flood mid December 2005. Over 400 service members and families evacuated. In 2006, a newly installed protective berm prevented a nearly second consecutive year of flooding.

When NATO took military intervention in Libya in 2011, NAS Sigonella played an important role in US Operation Odyssey Dawn because of its short distance to the country. As Libya remained unstable in 2013, a Special Purpose Marine Air Ground Task Force–Crisis Response unit was formed and an element of this was moved to the base to be within V-22 range of Libya.

In 2019, an investigation by Sigonella's Naval Criminal Investigative Service (NCIS) office and the local Carabinieri led to the arrest of 18 individuals suspected of stealing over 100,000 liters (22,000 imp gal; 26,000 U.S. gal) of JP-5 jet fuel. According to the investigators, the criminal operation, which involved the siphoning of jet fuel from a pipeline connecting Augusta Bay with NAS Sigonella, had been ongoing for almost 3 years and caused approximately 800,000 Euros in damages.

During the COVID-19 pandemic in Italy, most of the base including recreational facilities, daycare programs, and the school were shut down to slow the spread of the COVID-19 Coronavirus.

=== Denial of U.S. base access during the Iran war ===
On 31 March 2026, Italy denied the United States Air Force the use of the Sigonella base for operations related to the war in Iran, with the government stating that any use of Italian bases must comply with the Constitution and international law, and emphasizing national sovereignty over military installations.

== Facilities ==
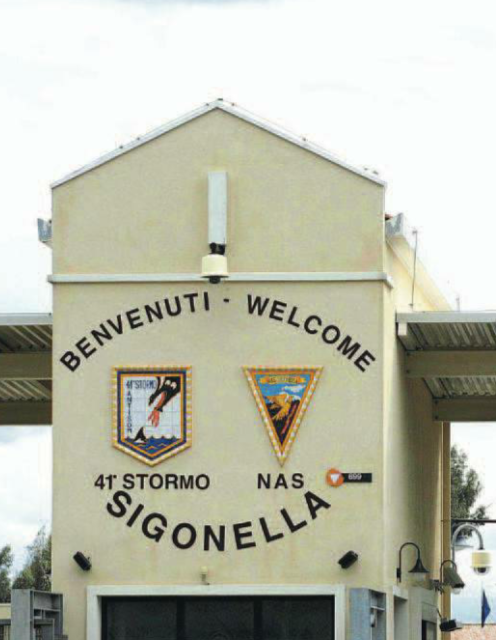
Entrance to the Sigonella air base

=== Airport ===
The airport resides at an elevation of 79 feet (24 m) above mean sea level. It has two asphalt paved runways: 10R/28L which measures 2,462 by 45 metres (8,077 ft × 148 ft) and 10L/28R measuring 2,442 by 28 metres (8,012 ft × 92 ft).

=== Housing ===
Most permanent party military personnel and families are housed in Marinai, located 2 minutes from NAS II and approximately 10–15 minutes from NAS I. Marinai flooded in December 2005 displacing many families temporarily. Also in Marinai are Boy Scout Troop 53 and Cub Scout Pack 53. Previously, "Mineo" was used as a housing base, but has since been returned to Italian Nationals and is no longer in service. Temporarily deployed unaccompanied military personnel, typically from rotational squadrons deployed from the United States, are housed in bachelor enlisted quarters and bachelor officer quarters located at NAS II.

From 1987 to 2002, there was a base housing development Villaggio Costanzo which was located in the village of Santa Maria La Stella, in the comune of Aci Sant'Antonio, and approximately 60 minutes from NAS I. The closest community to the base is Motta Sant'Anastasia, where many military personnel and their families live in rented accommodations on the economy. Relations between the Americans and the local Italian nationals are cordial, despite some anti-American demonstrations outside the base protesting the Iraq War. Many Italian nationals are employed as civilian workers at the base.

=== Educational opportunities ===
Family support includes pre-Kindergarten and Department of Defense Dependent Schools (DoDDs) K-12 schooling. In-person college-level courses are delivered by several universities. In particular, the University of Maryland Global Campus – Europe (formerly the European Division) offers a wide range of courses, depending on demand.

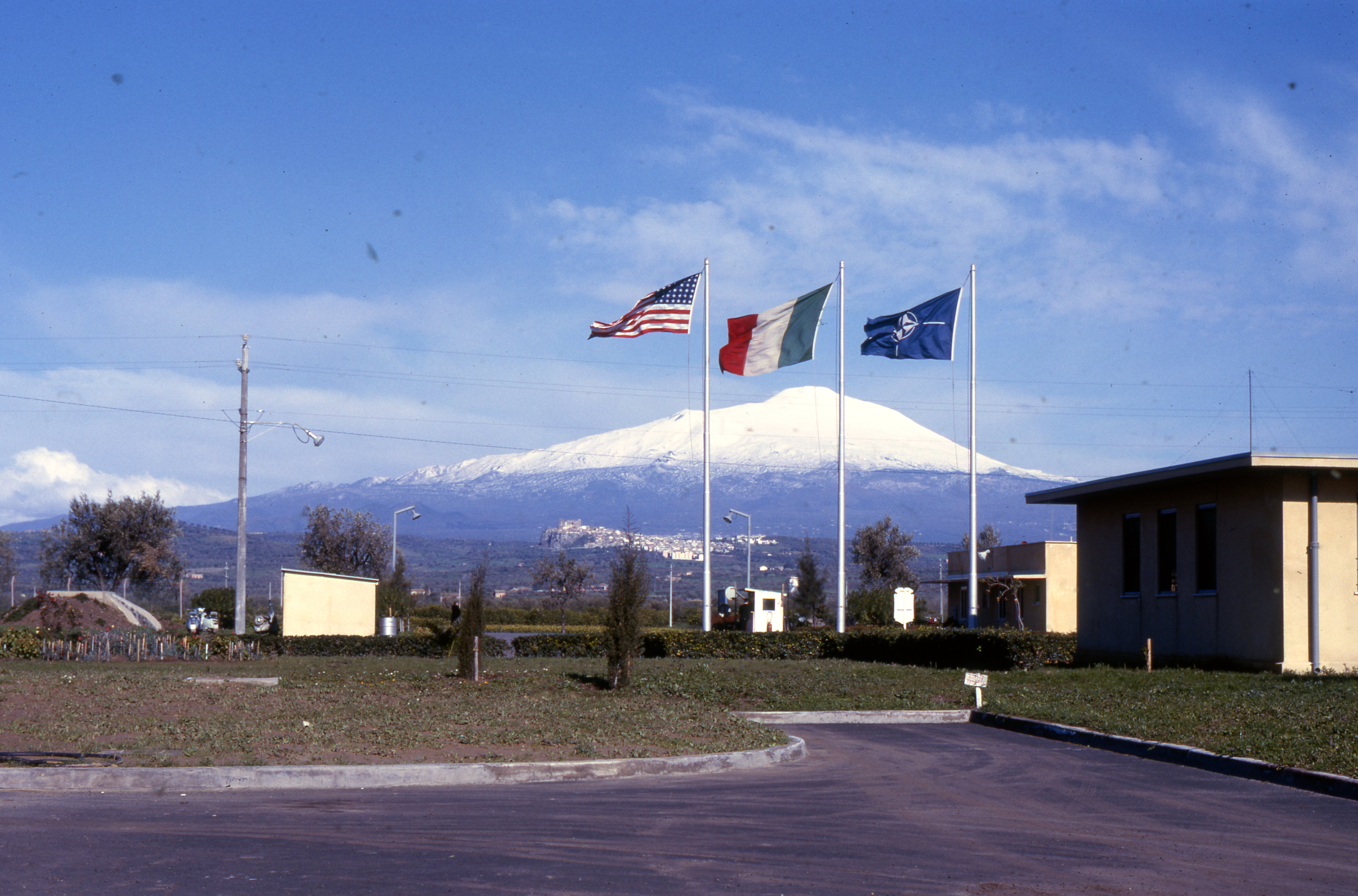

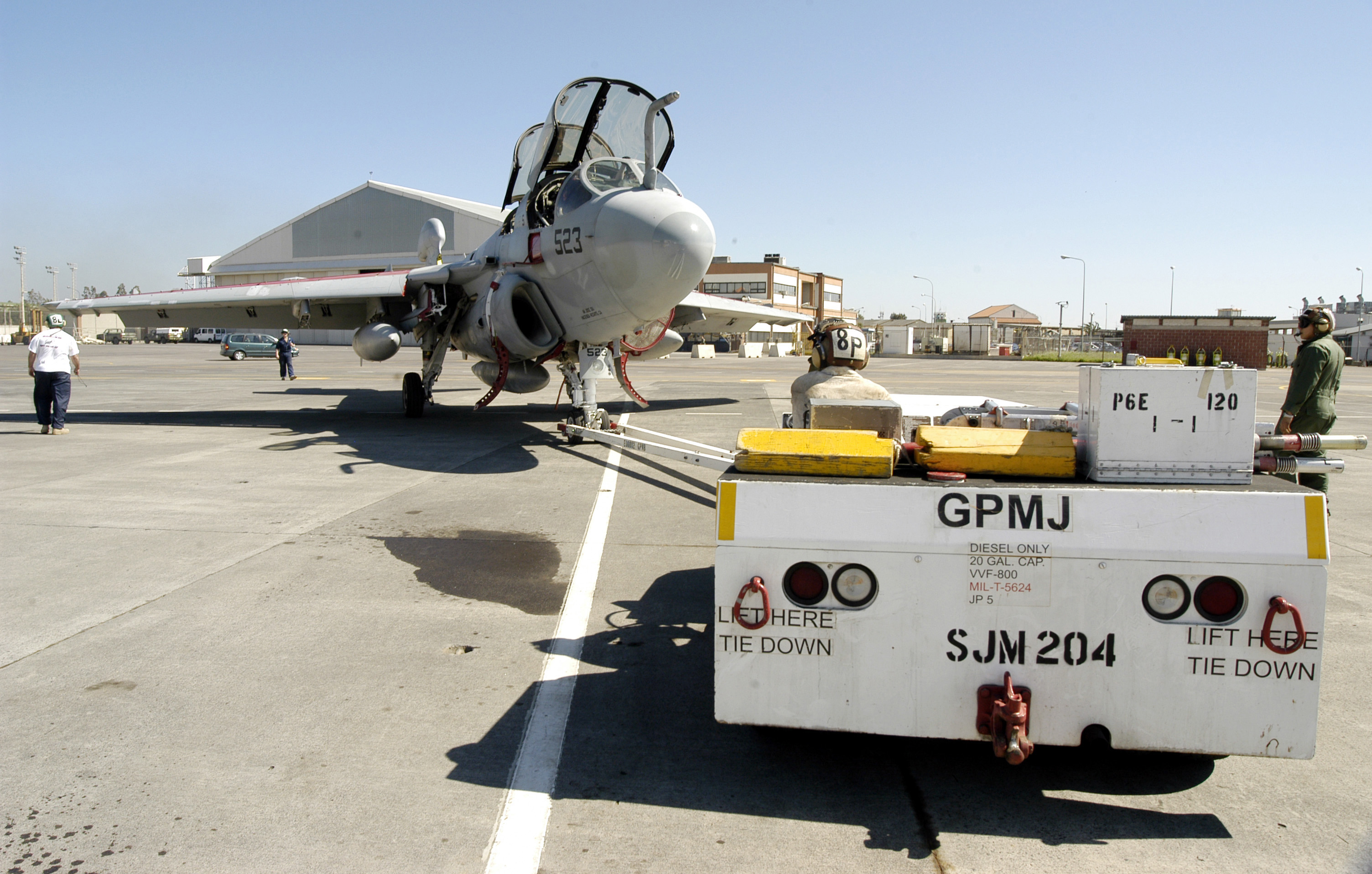

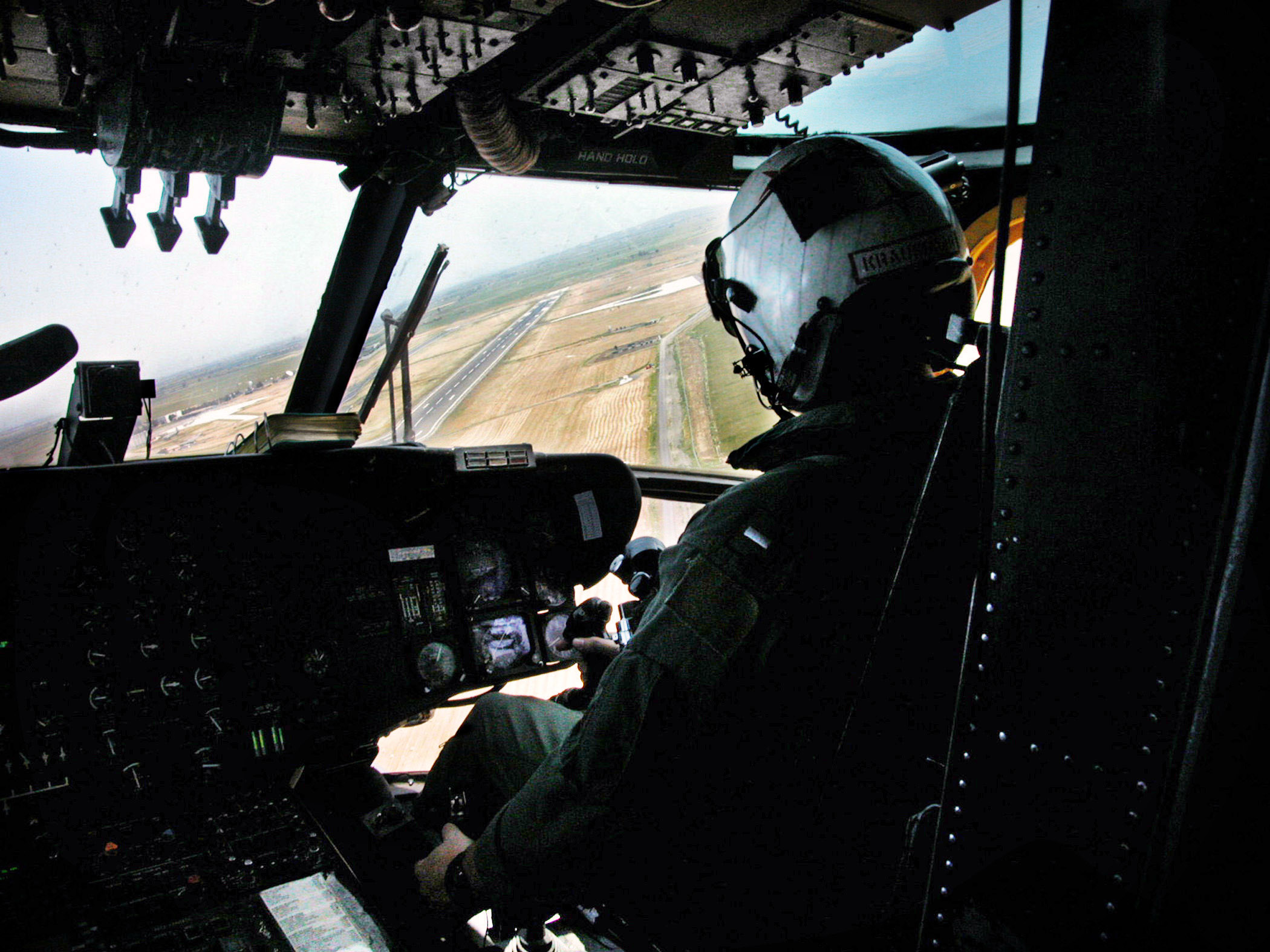

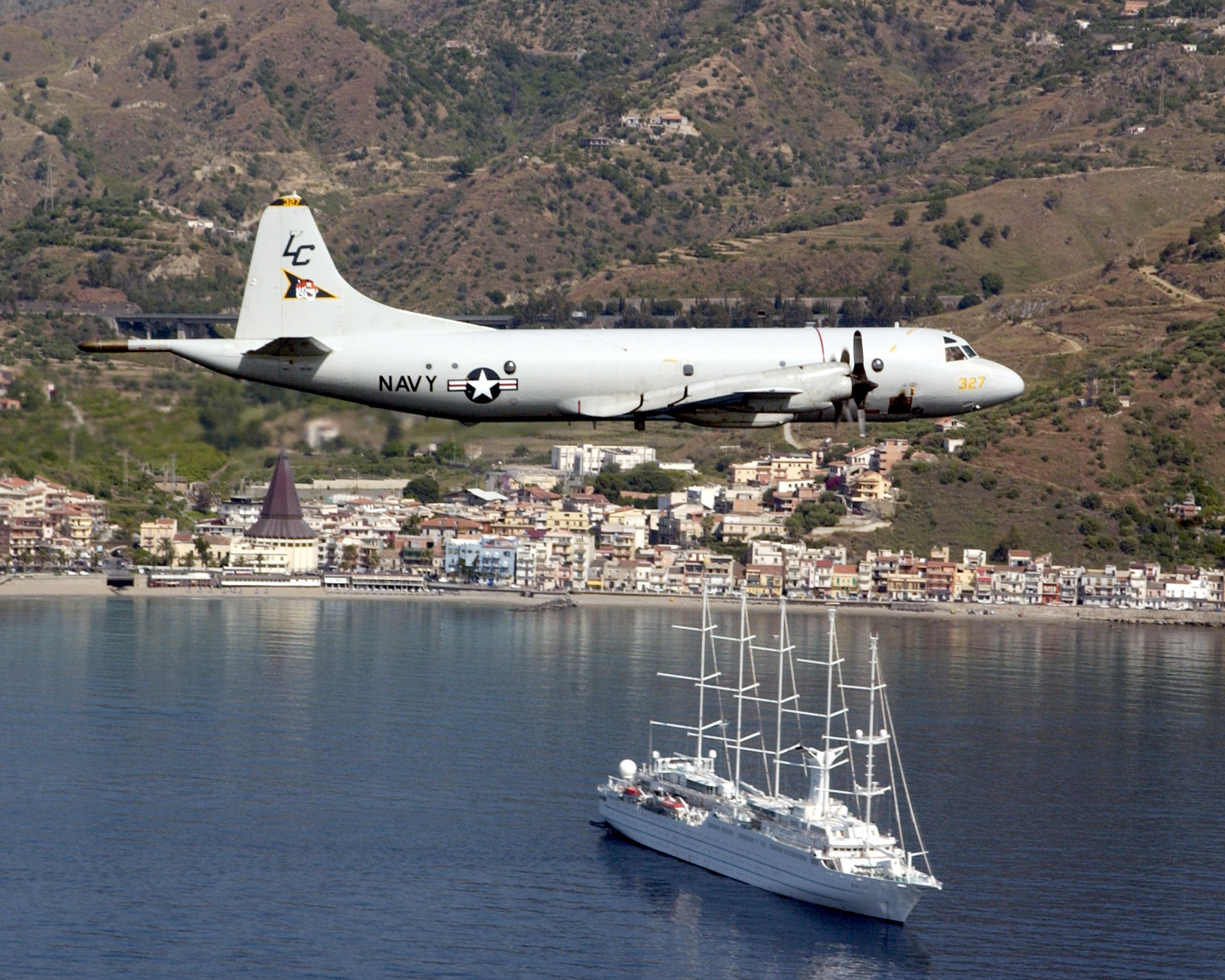

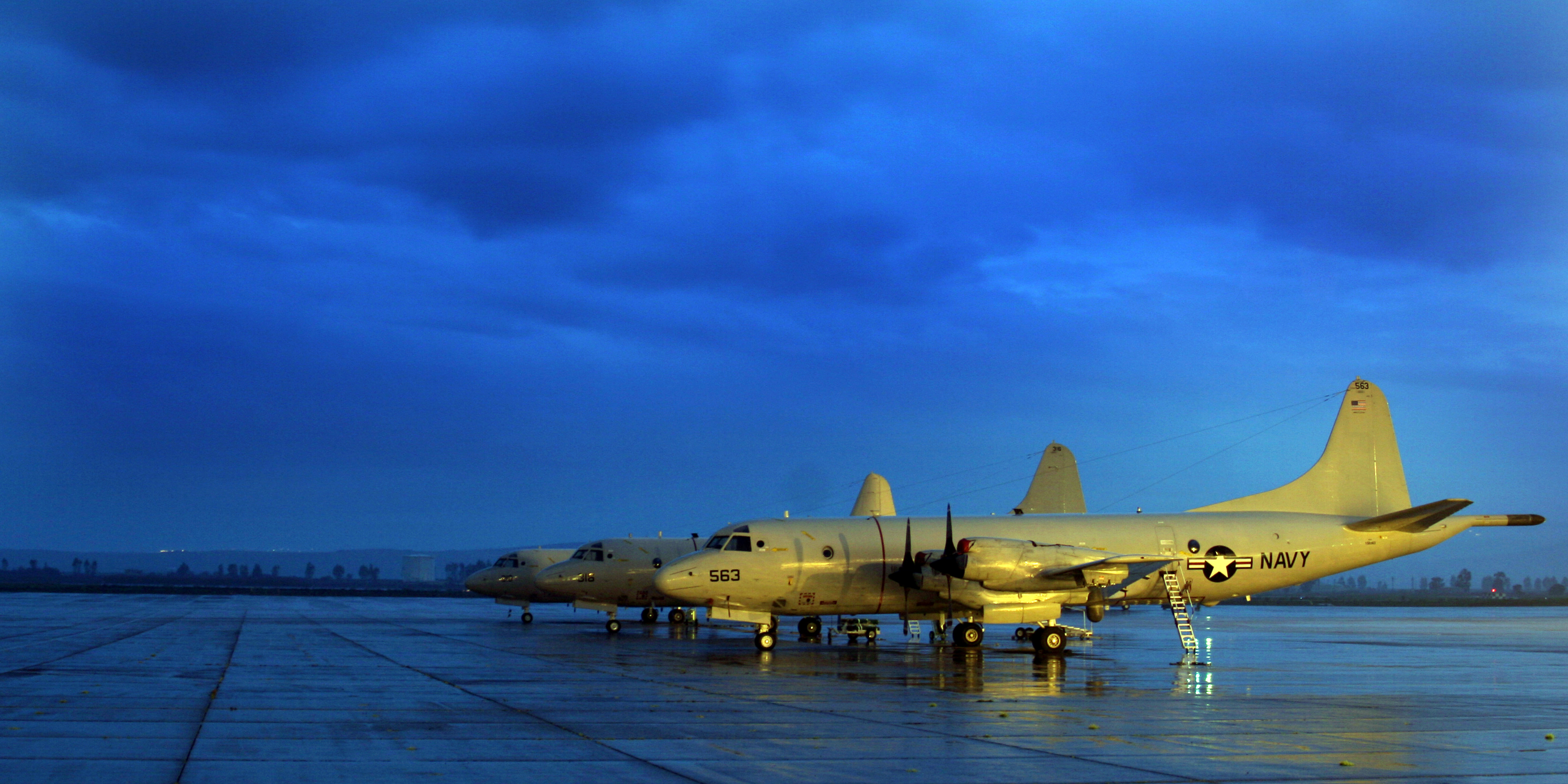

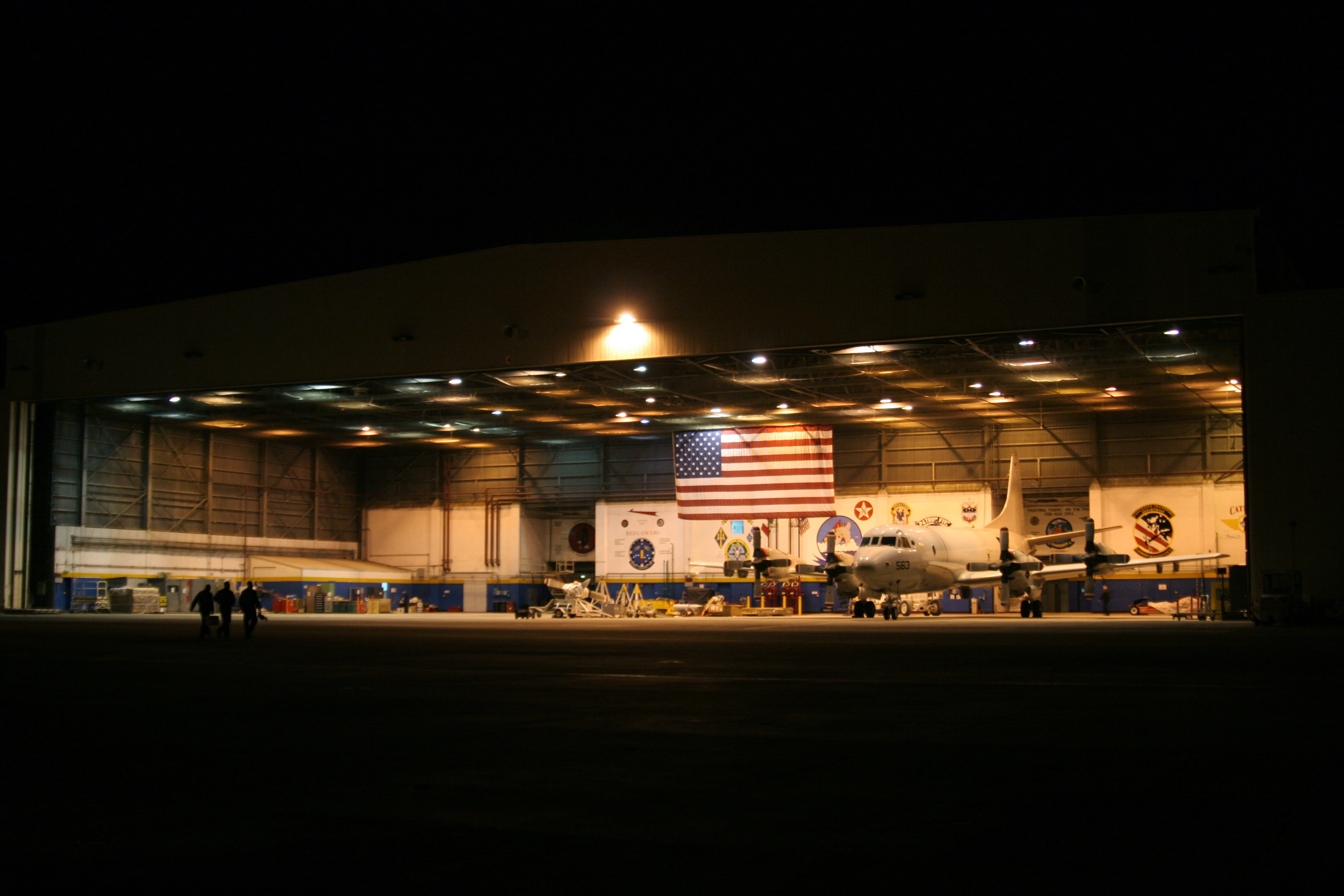

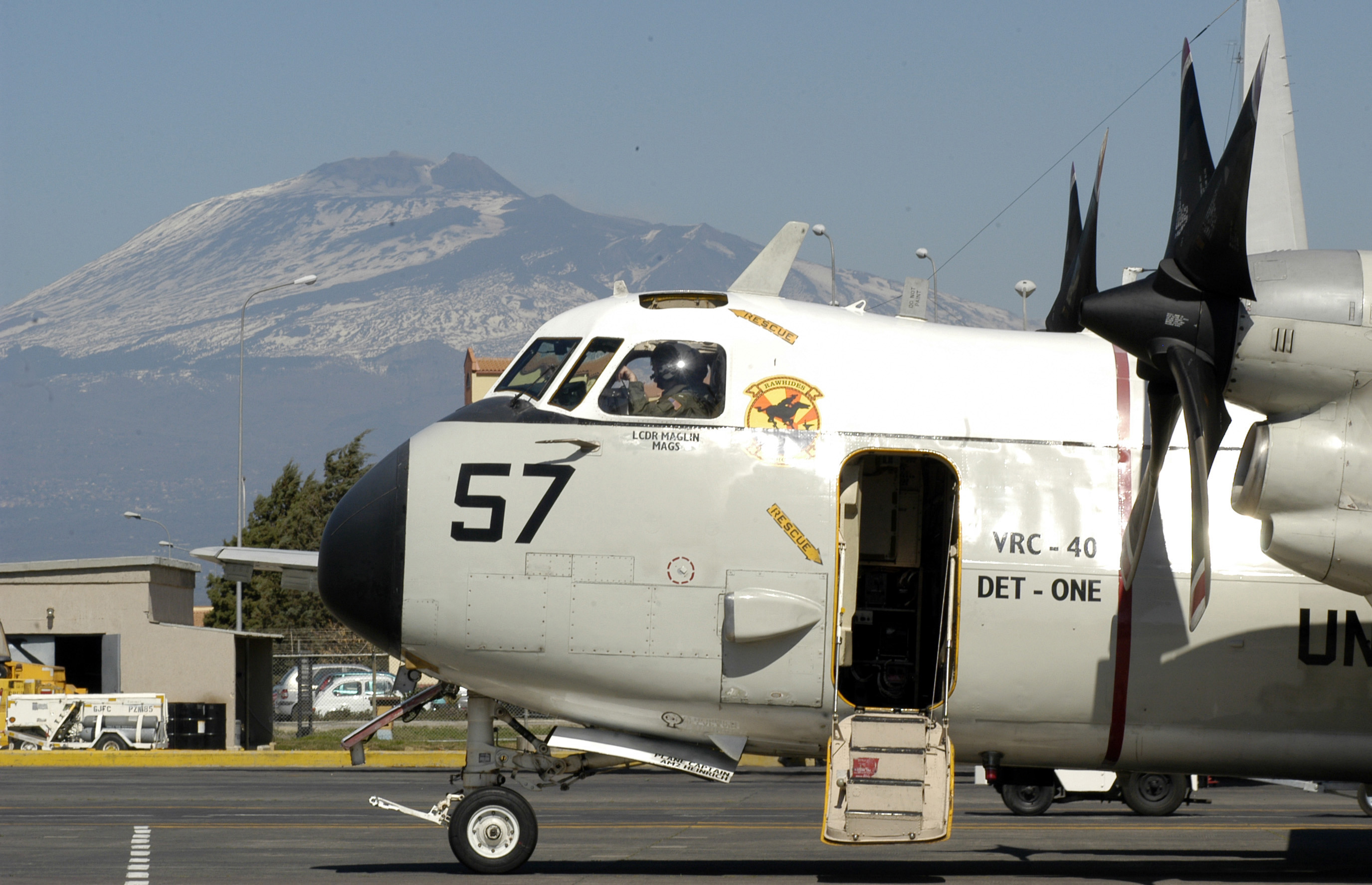

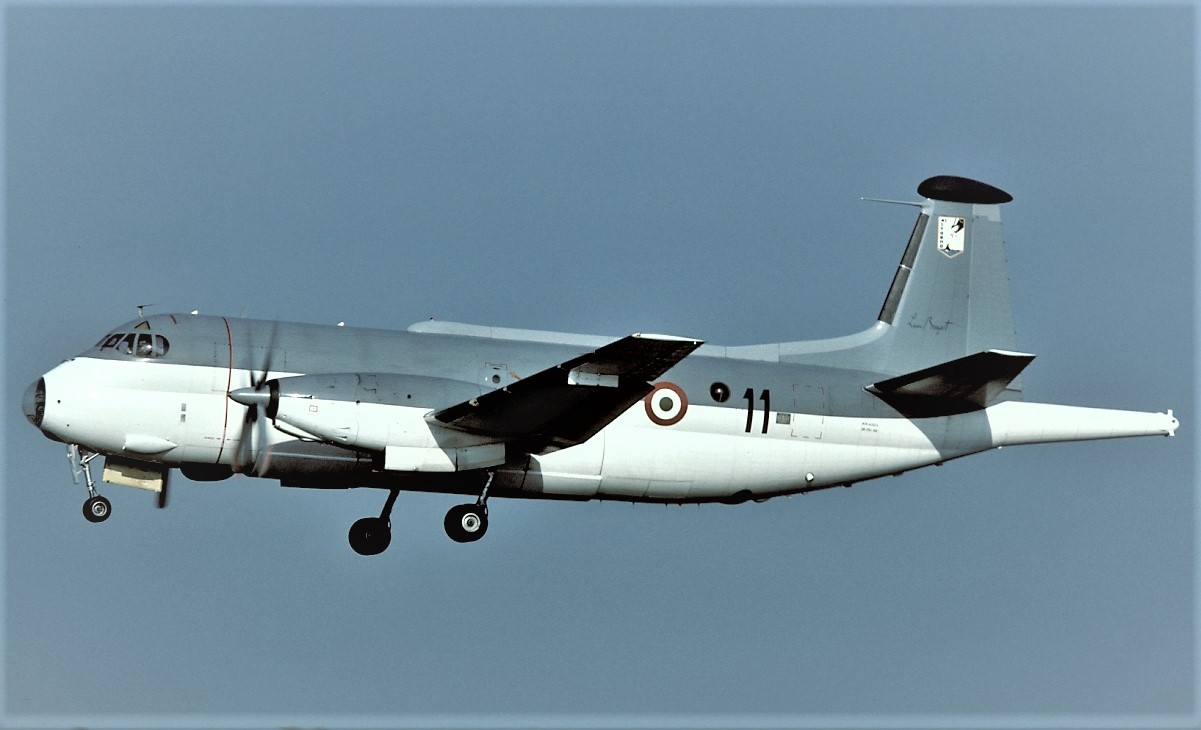

== Based units ==
Flying and notable non-flying units based at NAS Sigonella.

Units marked GSU are Geographically Separate Units, which although based at Sigonella, are subordinate to a parent unit based at another location.

=== Italian Air Force ===
Support and Special Forces Command

- Sigonella Air Base Command (Comando Aeroporto Sigonella)
- 41st (Anti-submarine) Wing (41° Stormo AntiSom) – P-72A
  - 86th (Crew training) Wing (86º Gruppo CAE)
- 11th Department aircraft maintenance (11° Reparto manutenzione velivoli)

Combat Forces Command

- 32nd Wing (32° Stormo)
  - 61st Unmanned Aerial Vehicle Squadron (61° Gruppo APR) – MQ-1C Predator A+

=== Italian Navy ===
Aviation Inspector for the Navy

- 88th (Anti-submarine) Wing (88° Gruppo AntiSom) – P-72A

=== United States Navy ===
- Aircraft Intermediate Maintenance Detachment
- Aviation Supply Depot
- Air Operations Department – C-26D Metroliner
- Commander, Fleet Logistics Support Wing (CFLSW)
  - Executive Transport Department Sigonella – C-20G Gulfstream IV
  - Fleet Logistics Support Wing Detachment – Supports C-130T Hercules and C-40A Clipper on detachment
- Commander Helicopter Sea Combat Wing ATLANTIC (COMHSCWINGLANT)
  - Helicopter Sea Combat Squadron 28 (HSC-28), Detachment 1 – MH-60S Seahawk
- Naval Computer and Telecommunications Station Sicily
- Naval Medical Research Unit Three (NAMRU-3)

Naval Supply Systems Command (NAVSUP)

- NAVSUP Fleet Logistics Center Sigonella

Commander, U.S. Naval Forces Europe-Naval Forces Africa (CNE-CNA)

- US Sixth Fleet
  - Commander Task Force 67 (CTF-67)
    - TG-67.1 (Maritime Patrol) – P-8A Poseidon
    - TG-67.2 (Tactical Operation Center)
    - TU-67.2.1 (Mobile Tactical Operation Center)
    - TG-67.3 (Unmanned Aerial Vehicles) – MQ-4C Triton

=== United States Air Force ===
Air Combat Command (ACC)

- Sixteenth Air Force
  - 319th Reconnaissance Wing
    - 319th Operations Group
      - 7th Reconnaissance Squadron (GSU) – RQ-4B Global Hawk

US Air Forces in Europe - Air Forces Africa (USAFE-AFAFRICA)

- Third Air Force
  - 435th Air Expeditionary Wing
    - 409th Air Expeditionary Group
      - 324th Expeditionary Reconnaissance Squadron (GSU)

=== NATO ===
NATO Alliance Ground Surveillance Force (NAGSF)

- Alliance Ground Surveillance – RQ-4D Phoenix

=== European Union ===
EU NAVFOR Med

- Operation Irini

== See also ==
- Alliance Ground Surveillance (AGS)
- Mobile User Objective System (MUOS)
- Crisis of Sigonella
