= Operation Turus =

British military operation in Nigeria

- Part of Boko Haram insurgency
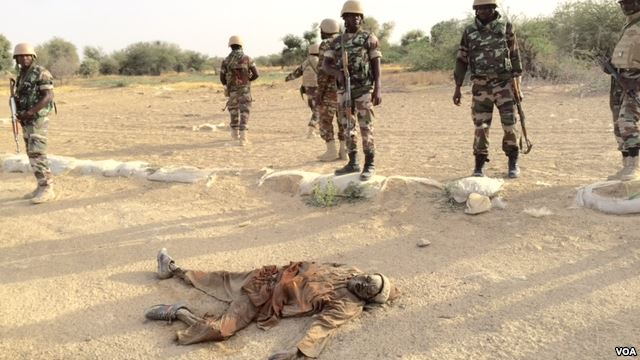
- Nigerian troops during the Boko Haram Insurgency.
- Location: Nigeria
- Date: April 2014 – April 2024
- Executed by: United Kingdom

Operation Turus was the code name of the British military operation to assist Nigeria during the Boko Haram insurgency. It was launched in April 2014 by Prime Minister David Cameron in response to the Chibok schoolgirls kidnapping which saw over a hundred schoolgirls kidnapped by Boko Haram, a jihadist terrorist organisation in northeastern Nigeria. Initial efforts were focused on the search for the missing schoolgirls, with the UK deploying military specialists, satellite imagery and reconnaissance aircraft from the Royal Air Force. According to a source quoted in The Observer, the UK successfully located the missing schoolgirls and offered to rescue them but this offer was rejected by the Nigerian government which considered it a national issue. Most of the schoolgirls remain missing.

From 2014, the UK shifted its focus towards training and supporting the Nigerian Armed Forces to help it counter violent extremists. In 2015, 350 British troops were deployed in the country to deliver a training programme. Training was provided by Short Term Training Teams (STTTs) which are typically rotated every six weeks. The operation ended in April 2024, with British troops having delivered 25 training courses to over a thousand of their Nigerian counterparts over the course of its final year.

== Background ==
From 2009, Boko Haram, a jihadist terrorist organisation based in northeastern Nigeria, waged an insurgency in an attempt to institute an Islamic caliphate in Nigeria. By 2014, violent attacks perpetrated by the group had killed tens of thousands of people. A government crackdown ensued which saw a state of emergency declared in Borno, Yobe and Adamawa. Under pressure, Boko Haram was forced to retreat to rural, mountainous areas where they began to target civilians. Their numbers were bolstered by Islamist militants fleeing from nearby Mali due to a French counter-insurgency operation there.

In 2010, in opposition to Western education — which it claimed detracted from Islamic teachings — Boko Haram began to target schools. The group was known for targeting female students, which it believed should not be educated and instead used as cooks or sex slaves.

=== Attacks on British citizens ===
In 2011, Boko Haram abducted a British citizen along with an Italian citizen in Birnin-Kebbi and threatened to execute them unless demands were met. The UK launched a rescue mission carried out by the special forces unit, the Special Boat Service. The rescue attempt failed, resulting in the execution of both hostages. In another incident, Ansaru, an off-shoot of Boko Haram, kidnapped seven construction workers, including one Briton in February 2013. The hostages were executed preemptively in March after the captors mistakenly believed British military deployments in nearby Mali (which were in support of Operation Newcombe) were part of a rescue operation.

In 2014, the group was blamed for 4,000 deaths and it received support from other Islamist terrorist organisations, including al-Qaeda in the Islamic Maghreb and Al-Qaeda in the Arabian Peninsula.

=== Chibok schoolgirl kidnapping ===
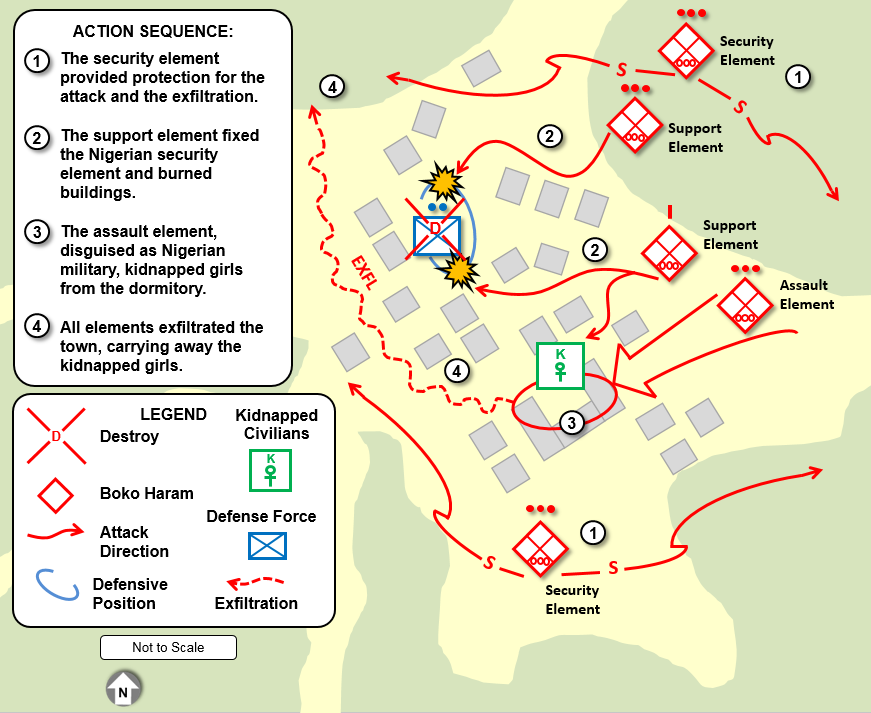
The action sequence of the Chibok schoolgirls kidnapping in 2014.

On 14 April 2014, Boko Haram kidnapped 276 female students from a secondary school in Chibok, Nigeria. In the days following, the Nigerian military announced most of the girls had been freed or had escaped, however parents claimed their children remained unaccounted for. Many parents ventured out to search for their children and claimed they saw no evidence of any military support. Major General Chris Olukolade subsequently admitted that the military's earlier statement was incorrect and that "more than 200" girls remained missing. Government inaction caused uproar in Nigeria, resulting in marches and a "#BringBackOurGirls" hashtag trend on social media. On 4 May, President Goodluck Jonathan made his first public comments on the abduction and announced the country was seeking assistance from the United States and other world powers in tackling Nigeria's "security challenge". British and American security experts subsequently arrived on 9 May. In a phone call to President Jonathan, British Prime Minister David Cameron offered the UK's support in finding the missing schoolgirls.

== Deployment ==
The mission statement for Turus is: Influence and train the operational capability and capacity of the Armed Forces of Nigeria and Multi-National Joint Task Force, in order to counter Violent Extremist Organisation activity in the North East of Nigeria and the Lake Chad Basin area and contribute to Her Majesty's Government's policy goals and objectives.

— Minister of State for Defence Annabel Goldie, UK Parliament (2020)

=== The search for the missing schoolgirls ===
In May 2014, the Royal Air Force deployed a Sentinel R1 surveillance aircraft from No. 5 Squadron RAF to assist with the search for the missing schoolgirls. The aircraft was based in Accra, Ghana and developed a fault days into its deployment. It was subsequently repaired in Senegal and returned to operations. In 10 sorties, the aircraft had mapped the whole of Nigeria using its dual-mode synthetic aperture radar / moving target indication (SAR/MTI) radar. A team consisting of military advisors was also deployed to Nigeria's capital, Abuja, to work alongside similar American and French teams. The deployment augmented an existing British Military Advisory Training Team (BMATT) and included special forces personnel.

According to The Observer, the RAF successfully located the kidnapped schoolgirls and offered to rescue them, however the Nigerian government declined. Notes from meetings obtained through the Freedom of Information Act revealed that Nigeria shunned international offers to rescue the girls as it considered the incident a "national issue".

In August 2014, three Tornado GR4 strike aircraft from No. 2 Squadron RAF were deployed to Chad. Based in N'Djamena, the aircraft flew over Nigeria equipped with RAPTOR reconnaissance pods and supported the search for the missing schoolgirls. The detachment comprised up to 91 military personnel and had returned to the UK by 17 October. A total of 56 sorties had been made, including the transit from the UK. The aircraft were also unarmed and required no tanker support. The UK also provided satellite imagery.

=== Training mission ===
In June 2014, Foreign Secretary William Hague announced the UK would increase its military aid to Nigeria, including a tactical training programme.

In 2015, the UK had around 130 military personnel deployed in Nigeria, including Short Term Training Teams (STTT) which were mainly supported by 2nd Battalion, The Royal Anglian Regiment. In December, Defence Secretary Michael Fallon announced this deployed force would be doubled to "up to 300" in 2016. The STTT's were typically deployed on six-week rotations.

In 2016, a team of RAF personnel was deployed to provide the Nigerian Air Force training on airfield defence and counter-insurgency. 2nd Battalion, The Royal Anglian Regiment remained in the country through 2016 and provided training on infantry skills, civil-military affairs, IEDs and leadership. Nearly 1,000 Nigerian military personnel had benefited from British military training. A total of 350 British military personnel were deployed to the country, including 101 (City of London) Engineer Regiment.

In 2017, 700 British military personnel had been deployed to Nigeria, including personnel from 7th Infantry Brigade and the RAF Regiment, training over 28,500 members of the Nigerian military. The third STTT in the five-year programme saw involvement from No. 5 Royal Air Force Protection Wing and No. 51 Squadron RAF Regiment.

In 2018, the UK expanded its provision of equipment and training, having trained 30,000 Nigerian military personnel since 2015.

In 2019, No. 5 Force Protection Wing RAF deployed its eighth of ten STTTs. 7,000 kg of equipment necessary for the deployment was transported via an A400M Atlas transport aircraft. The RAF Police were also involved in this deployment and delivered training on military working dogs, counter intelligence and specialist investigations.

In May 2022, British Army Colonel Neil Wright MBE assumed command of the operation. Soldiers from the Yorkshire Regiment were deployed to deliver training in August.

== See also ==
- Operation Newcombe - A similar British military operation to assist counter-insurgency operations in Mali.
