= Alliance Ground Surveillance Force =

NATO Intelligence, Surveillance, and Reconnaissance Force
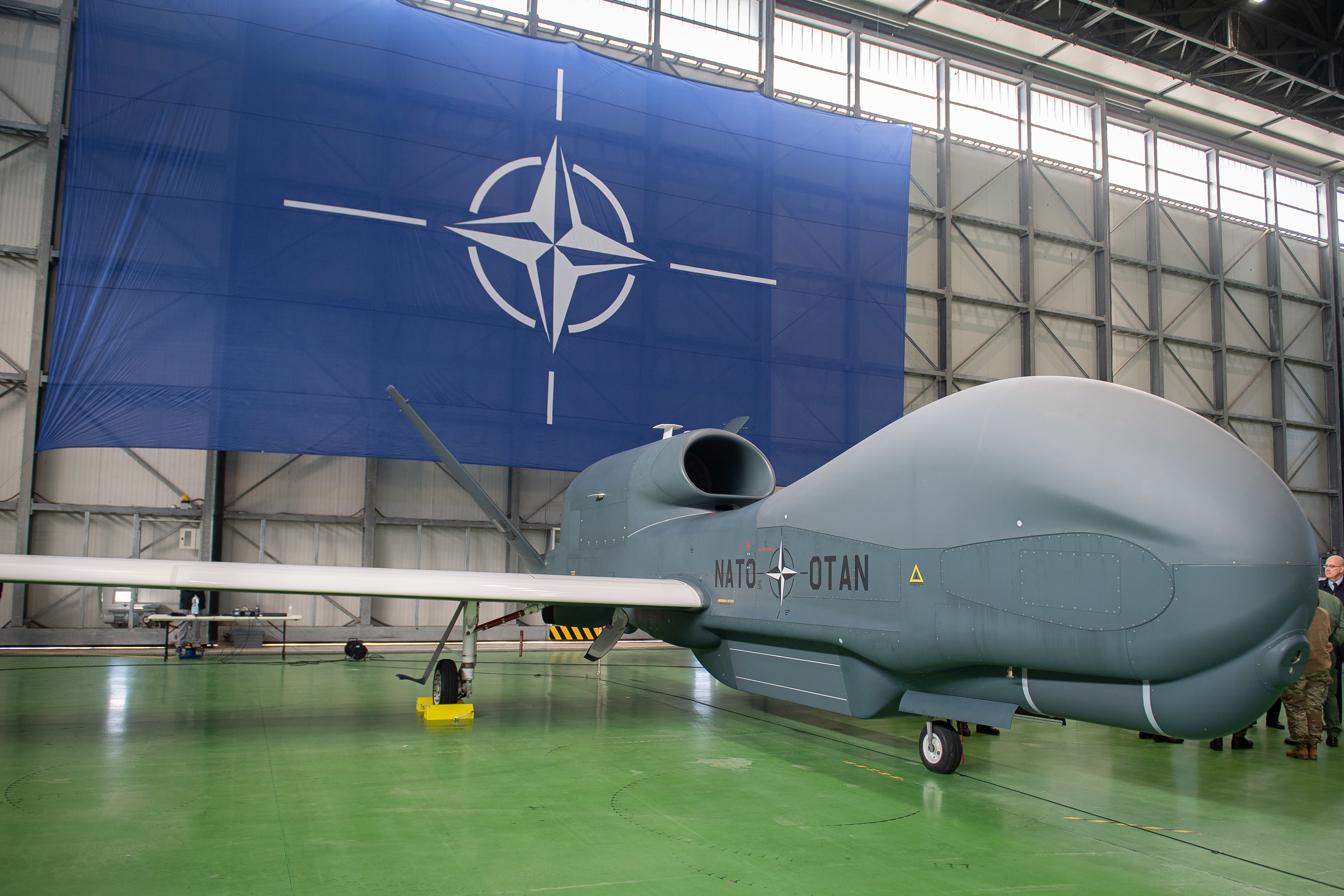
- NATO AGS RQ-4D Phoenix
- Active: September 2015 – present
- Country: Member countries: Bulgaria; Czech Republic; Denmark; Estonia; Germany; Italy; Latvia; Lithuania; Luxembourg; Norway; Poland; Romania; Slovakia; Slovenia; United States
- Role: Intelligence, surveillance and reconnaissance
- Size: 400
- Part of: Allied Air Command
- Garrison/HQ: Sigonella, Italy
- Equipment: RQ-4D Phoenix
- Website: nisrf.nato.int

Commanders
- Commander: Brigadier General Andrew M. Clark

Alliance Ground Surveillance (AGS) is a NATO program to acquire an airborne ground surveillance capability (Multi-Platform Radar Technology Insertion Program on the Northrop Grumman RQ-4 Global Hawk). The NATO Intelligence, Surveillance, and Reconnaissance Force (NISRF) formerly known as the NATO Alliance Ground Surveillance Force (NAGSF) was activated in September 2015, after it was formally agreed on the configuration of the unit responsible for operating the remotely piloted aircraft.

In a similar fashion as with Strategic Airlift Capability the program is run by 15 NATO member states: Bulgaria, Czech Republic, Denmark, Estonia, Germany, Italy, Latvia, Lithuania, Luxembourg, Norway, Poland, Romania, Slovakia, Slovenia, and the United States.

The AGS Core comprises five RQ-4D Phoenix remotely piloted aircraft and the associated European-sourced ground command and control stations, and is based at AGS Main Operating Base in Sigonella, Italy. Approximately 400 personnel are located at Sigonella. Additionally, a small number of staff elements are based at Allied Command Operations in Mons, Belgium and at Allied Air Command in Ramstein, Germany.

== History ==
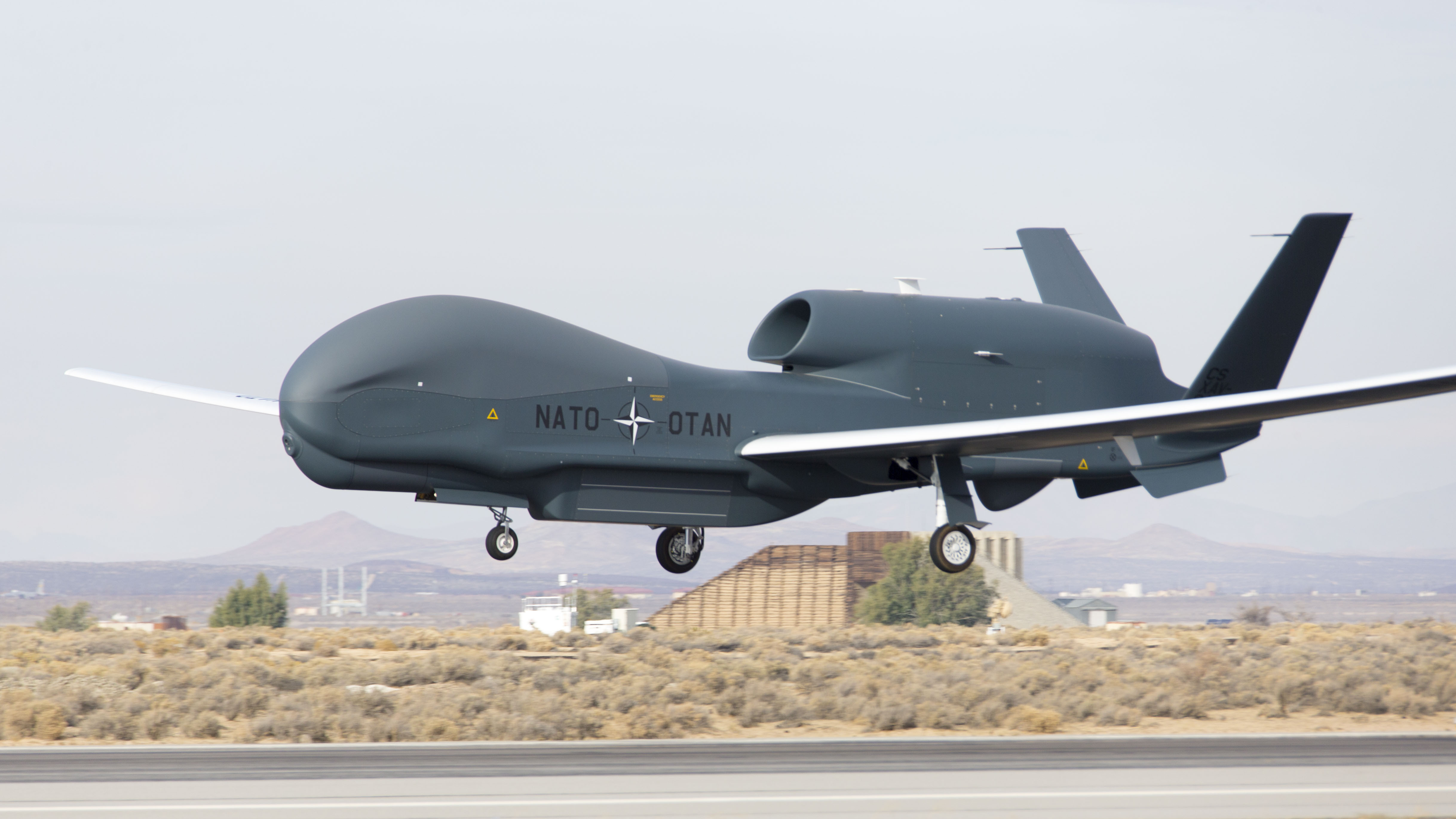
First AGS RQ-4D at Edwards Air Force Base on 19 December 2015

The programme originated in NATO's Defence Planning Committee in 1992, with the capability acquisition being defined in 1995. It was initially intended to be based on already existing or in development ground surveillance assets, later also including systems based on American or European radar. These approaches failed to obtain sufficient support however.

In 2004, NATO decided to move forward with a "mixed-fleet approach". The air segment was to include Airbus A321 aircraft and Global Hawk UAVs, while the ground segment was to comprise an extensive set of fixed and deployable ground stations. Due to declining European defence budgets, it was decided to drop the mixed-fleet approach in 2007, in favor of a simplified approach based on an air segment of Global Hawk Block 40 UAV and its associated MP-RTIP sensor, while the ground segment was to remain unchanged.

In September 2009, the NATO Alliance Ground Surveillance Management Agency (NAGSMA) was established after the participating countries agreed on the Programme Memorandum of Understanding (PMOU). At the 2010 Lisbon summit, the AGS featured as one of the most pressing capability needs of the Alliance. A procurement contract was signed with Northrop Grumman on 20 May 2012.

AGS was scheduled to reach initial operational capability by the end of 2017 with a main operating base at Sigonella Air Base, Italy. From 2016 to 2019, a number of test flights took place in order to develop and test AGS capabilities. These included the first remote controlled flight from the AGS Main Operating Base in Sigonella at the end of 2017.

First Global Hawk Block 40 UAVs destined for the NATO AGS program rolled off Northrop Grumman production line in Palmdale, California on 4 June 2015. One arrived at Edwards Air Force Base on December 19, 2015 completing its first flight and the rest stayed in plant 42 located in Palmdale.

In July 2017, the USAF assigned the Mission Designation Series (MDS) of RQ-4D to the NATO AGS air vehicle.

The first RQ-4D aircraft arrived at Sigonella Air Base (NAS2) on 21 November 2019. At that time, all five aircraft were undergoing developmental test flights. Initial operational capability (IOC) was expected in the first half of 2020. The last RQ-4D aircraft arrived on 12 November 2020. Initial operational capability was achieved in February 2021.

== Deployments ==
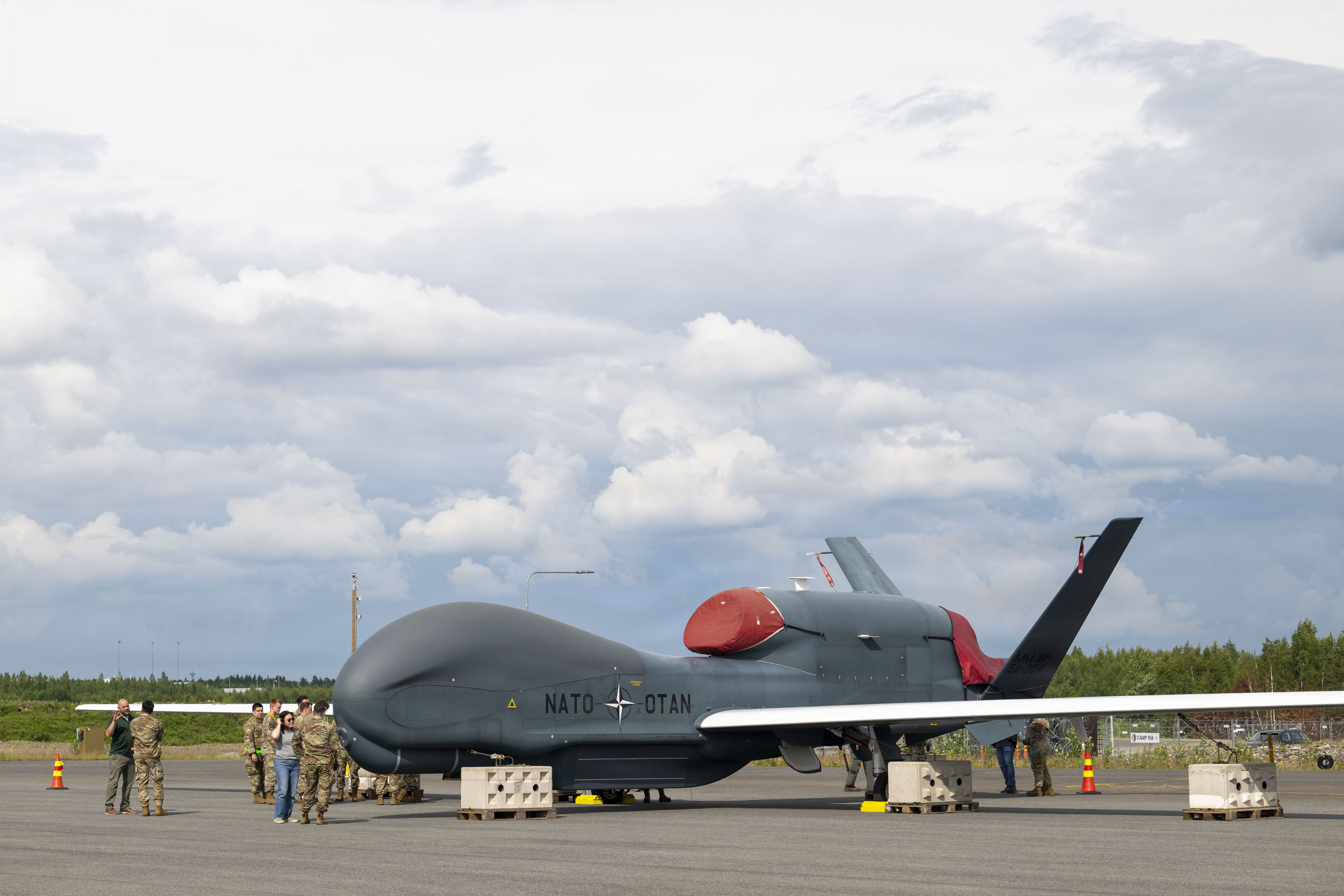
RQ-4D at Pirkkala Air Base during Ramstein Flag 2026

In 2015, NISRF participated in exercise Trident Juncture 2015 from NATO AGS Capability Testbed (NACT) in The Hague, Netherlands. During Unified Vision 2016, NISRF took part in an interoperability trial with NATO AWACS E-3A for two weeks.

Since 2022, NISRF drones have conducted numerous missions on eastern flank of the Alliance, mainly in the Black Sea region, following Russia's invasion of Ukraine. On 13 September 2023 a NISRF drone flew for the first time over Finland. The mission came as NATO continues to step up reconnaissance missions on the eastern flank. The mission also helped operators familiarize themselves with the new terrain.

In 2026, two RQ-4D drones of NISRF were deployed to Finland in support of the Ramstein Flag 2026 exercise. The deployment took place as part of the ongoing Agile Combat Employment operations demonstrating the capability of NISRF to operate away from its main base at Sigonella.

== Components ==
The AGS system comprises air, ground, mission operation and support elements. The air segment comprises five Global Hawk Block 40 and their control stations, while the ground segment includes an operational centre for analysis and data transmission (MOS - Mission Operations Support), two Transportable General Ground Stations (TGGS), and six Mobile General Ground Stations (MGGS). The MOS and TGGS of the ground segment are provided by the Italian company Leonardo S.p.A.. The company also coordinates the industrial participation of Italy, Bulgaria and Romania. The Mobile General Ground Stations are provided by Airbus Defence and Space.

== See also ==
- Unmanned aerial vehicle
- 7th Reconnaissance Squadron
- 12th Reconnaissance Squadron
- 348th Reconnaissance Squadron
