= Global Aviation and Services Group =

Airline of Libya

Global Air Transport
| IATA | ICAO | Call sign |
|---|---|---|
| 5S | GAK | AVIAGROUP |
- Founded: 2003
- Fleet size: 7
- Destinations: 10
- Headquarters: Mittiga International Airport; Tripoli, Libya
- Key people: Capt. Abdussalam I. Aradi, Chairman
- Website: https://globalairt.com/cargo/

Global Aviation and Services Group is a Libyan charter airline based in Tripoli and founded in 2003. It is currently banned from flying in the EU.

== History ==
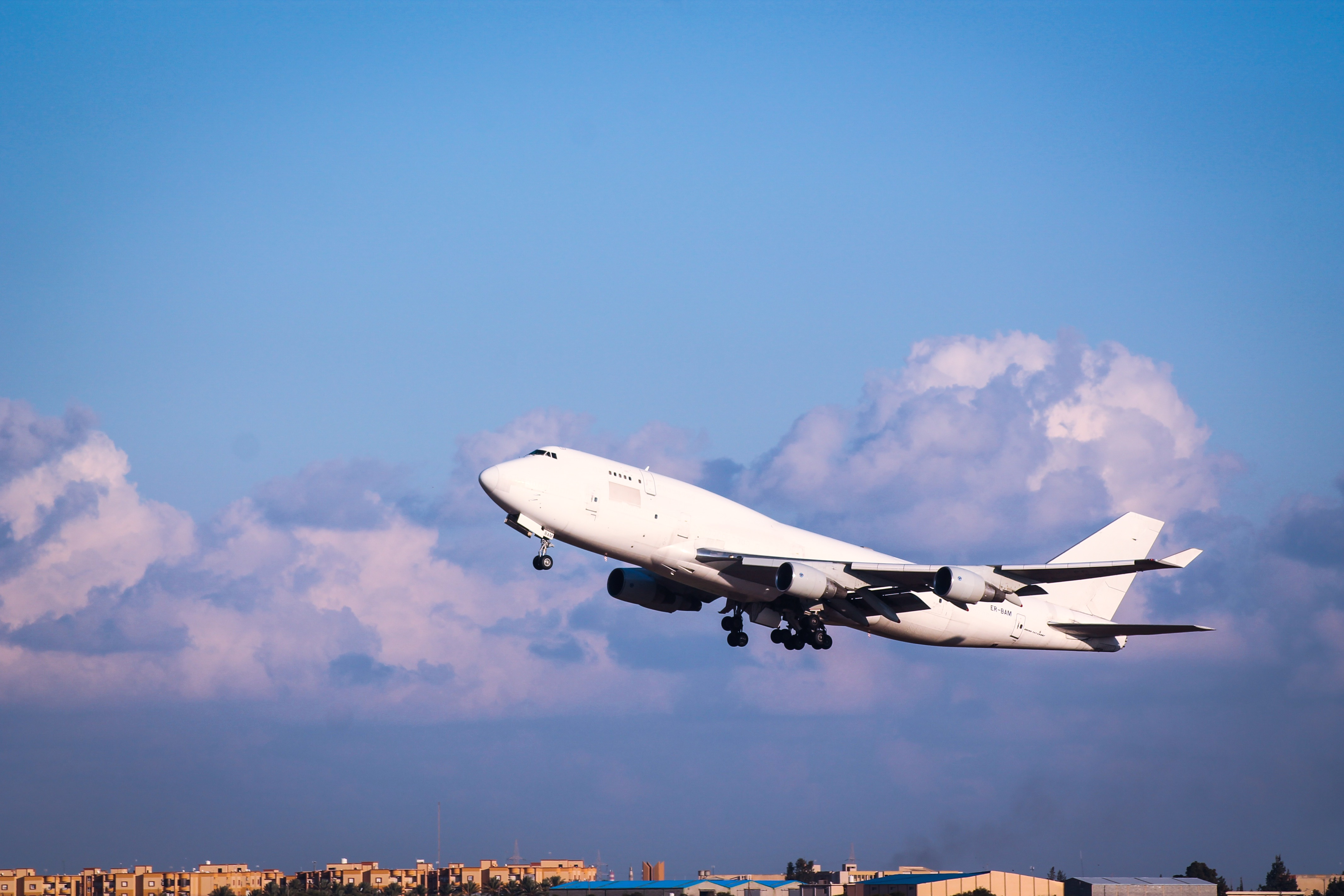
Global Aviation Boeing B747-400F at Misrata Airport

Global Aviation and Service Group (GASG) is a privately owned airline founded in 2003, acquired its Air Operator Certificate (A.O.C No 08/05) and started its official operation on January 4, 2006, as an international cargo and passenger airline.

== Services ==
GASG operates domestic services between Tripoli and Benghazi and other domestic destinations, as well as international services to United Arab Emirates, Turkey and Belgium.

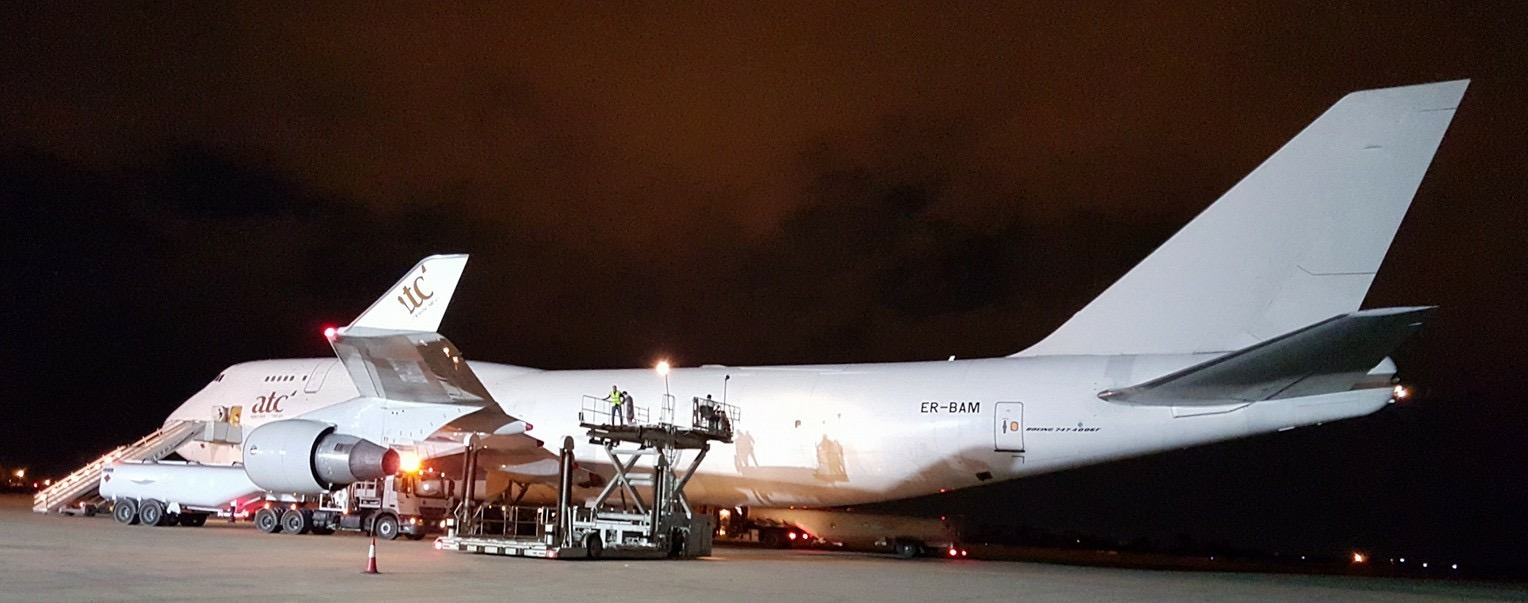
Global Aviation Boeing B747-400F operated by Aerotrans Cargo at Misrata Airport

=== Africa ===
- Libya
  - Tripoli (Tripoli International Airport)
  - Tripoli (Mitiga International Airport)
  - Misrata (Misrata Airport)
  - Benghazi (Benina International Airport)
  - Sabha (Sabha Airport)

=== Asia ===
- United Arab Emirates
  - Dubai (Dubai International Airport)
- India
  - Delhi (Indira Gandhi International Airport)

=== Europe ===
- Turkey
  - Istanbul (Istanbul Airport)
- Belgium
  - Brussels (Brussels Airport)
  - Ostend (Ostend Airport)

== Fleet ==
The GASG fleet consists of the following aircraft

| Type | In service | Orders | Notes |
|---|---|---|---|
| Boeing 747-400F | 3 | 0 | operated by Aerotrans Cargo |
| Ilyushin IL-76 | 1 | 0 | |
| Airbus A300-B4 | 1 | 0 | |
| Embraer 145 | 2 | 0 | |
