= Alzintan Airport =

Alzintan Airport Zintan Airport
- IATA: ZIS; ICAO: HLZN

Summary
- Airport type: Public
- Serves: Zintan
- Elevation AMSL: 2,080 ft / 634 m
- Coordinates: 31°46′30″N 12°15′00″E

Map
- Location of the airport in Libya

Runways
| Direction | Length | | Surface |
| Direction | m | ft | Surface |
|---|---|---|---|
| 02/20 | 2,760 | 9,055 | Asphalt |
- Source: SkyVector GCM

Alzintan Airport (IATA: ZIS, ICAO: HLZN) is an airport serving Zintan, a city in the Jabal al Gharbi District in northwest Libya. The runway is in the open desert 15 kilometres (9.3 mi) south of the city.

== History ==
=== 2015 airstrikes ===
In 2015, a series of aerial assaults were conducted on the town of Zintan during a period of heightened tension and conflict between rival factions in the country. The attacks, allegedly carried out by militias aligned with the Libya Dawn coalition, targeted the town which was known for its support of the government based in Tobruk.

Libya Dawn militias reportedly initiated the attacks on Zintan, targeting an airstrip and another location in the city. These strikes were seen as a possible response to Egyptian air raids in the region. The assault led to the cancellation of various flights scheduled to depart from Zintan's airport, carrying Egyptian and Libyan citizens for their safety. Two or three MiG 23 jets, believed to be remnants from Gaddafi's air force, were allegedly used in the operation. The first airstrike, around noon, damaged the edge of the town's runway. The second strike, four hours later, hit the town center. Authorities in Zintan reported damage to the runway.

Another incident occurred on March 24, when the Libyan Dawn coalition had bombed Zintans airport. Forces aligned with the Tobruk-based government had claimed to have shot down a warplane flown by Libya Dawn. However, the Tripoli Administration had reported that the plane crashed due to technical difficulties. The Zintan airport spokesman, Omar Matooq, reported that two pilots of the downed jet were found, with one found dead due to burns, and the other pilot arrested.

On April 1, an unidentified warplane conducted airstrikes on the airport in Zintan. The strike, which damaged a passenger terminal, was attributed by a military source to Libya Dawn. The following day, similar attacks occurred, with Zintan airport once again targeted by airstrikes, and the nearby town of Al-Rajban also facing bombardment.

On April 23, a Libya Dawn warplane conducted airstrikes on Zintan's airport, causing damage to a passenger terminal, and destroying an airfield control tower. The strike coincided with a separate attack on the town of Rujban, with some claiming the strikes were conducted from Mitiga Airport.

== Airlines and destinations ==
| Airlines | Destinations |
|---|---|
| Afriqiyah Airways | Benghazi |
| Fly Oya | Benghazi |

== See also ==
- Transport in Libya
- List of airports in Libya
