= Berniq Airways =

International airline based in Libya

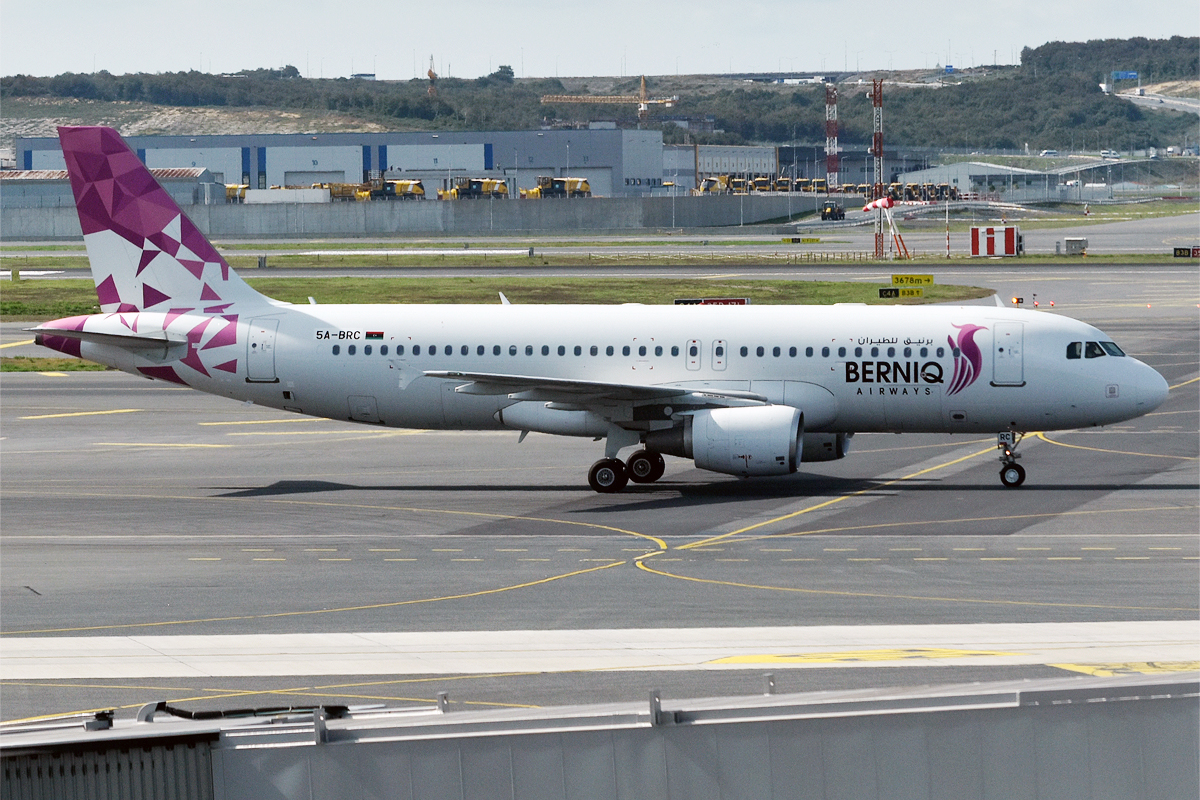
- Berniq Airways Airbus A320-214
IATA	ICAO	Call sign
NB	BNL	BERNIQ AIRWAYS
- Founded: 2018
- Hubs: Benina International Airport
- Fleet size: 7
- Destinations: 9
- Headquarters: Benghazi, Libya
- Key people: Waseem Ezzway (Chairman)
- Employees: 355 (2022)
- Website: berniq.aero

Berniq Airways is an international airline based in Benghazi, Libya. It was established in 2018. The airlines main hub is Benina International Airport serving both domestic and international flights, with flights also operated from Mitiga International Airport. Its largest shareholder is Benghazi's Bank of Commerce & Development, which is partly state-owned. The airline is named after the old Greek name of Benghazi, where its headquarters.

== History ==
On 4 February 2022, Berniq Airways operated its first international flight from Benghazi to Tunis, Tunisia.

On 16 May 2024, Berniq Airways announced a Memorandum of Understanding (MoU) with Airbus at the company's headquarters in Toulouse to purchase six new A320neo and A321neo aircraft. On 23 July 2024, it was announced at the Farnborough International Airshow that the airline had place a firm order for six A320neo family aircraft making it the first ever order, in the airlines history, for brand new aircraft.

== Destinations ==
As of November 2024, Berniq Airways operates scheduled flights to the following destinations:

Country	City	Airport	Notes	Refs
Egypt	Alexandria	Borg El Arab International Airport		
Egypt	Cairo	Cairo International Airport		
Libya	Bayda	Al Abraq International Airport		
Libya	Benghazi	Benina International Airport	Hub	
Libya	Misrata	Misrata Airport		
Libya	Tripoli	Mitiga International Airport		
Tunisia	Tunis	Tunis–Carthage International Airport		
Turkey	Istanbul	Istanbul Airport		
Saudi Arabia	Jeddah	King Abdulaziz International Airport		
Saudi Arabia	Medina	Prince Mohammad bin Abdulaziz International Airport		
United Arab Emirates	Dubai	Al Maktoum International Airport		
United Arab Emirates	Dubai	Dubai International Airport		

== Fleet ==
=== Current ===
As of July 2026, Berniq Airways operates the following aircraft:

Berniq Airways fleet
Aircraft	In service	Orders	Passengers			Notes
Aircraft	In service	Orders	C	Y	Total	Notes
Airbus A320	6	—	—	189	189	
Airbus A320neo	—	6	TBA			
Airbus A330-200	1	—	TBA			
Total	7	6				

=== Former fleet ===
As of August 2025, Berniq Airways operated 6 Airbus A320 and 1 Airbus A330-200.
