= Libyan Wings =

Airline of Libya

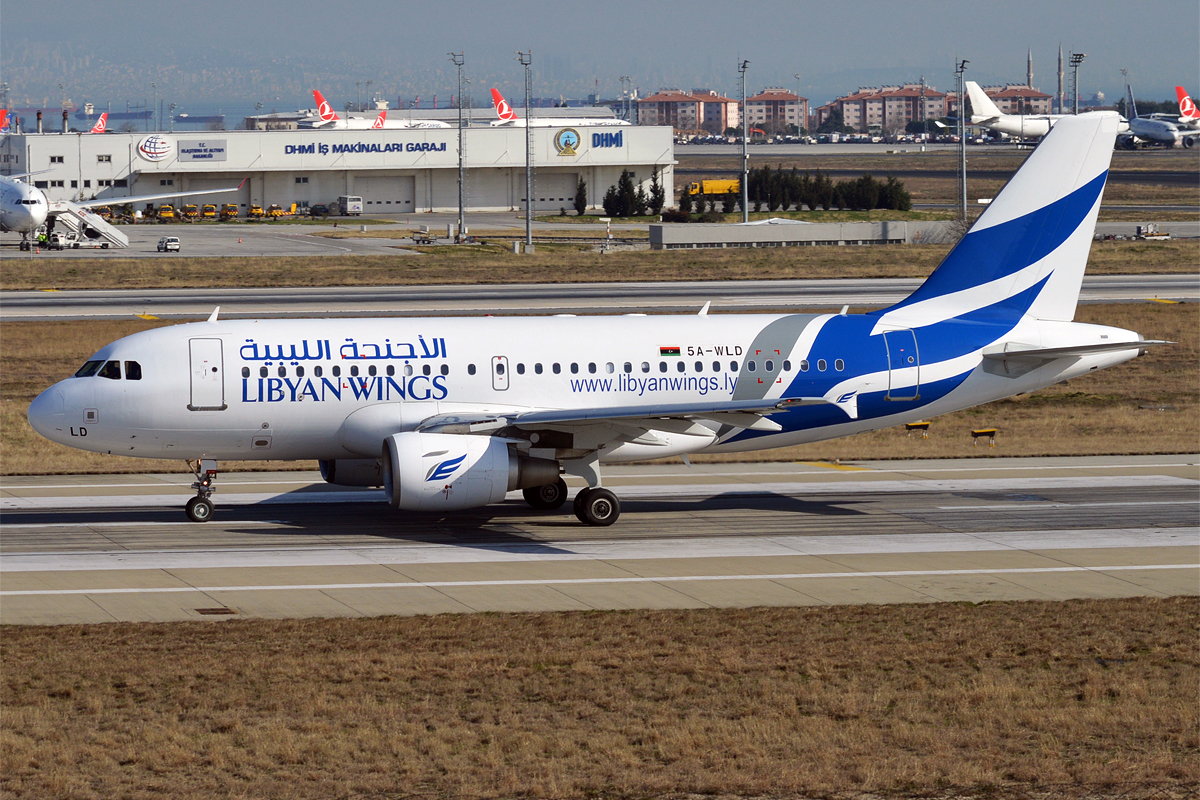
- Libyan Wings Airbus A319-112 in 2019
IATA	ICAO	Call sign
YL	LWA	LIBYAN WINGS
- Commenced operations: 21 September 2015
- Fleet size: 4
- Destinations: 4
- Headquarters: Tripoli, Libya
- Key people: Mohamed Ben Madi, Chairman
- Employees: 120–130 (November 2016)
- Website: https://libyanwings.aero

Libyan Wings Airlines Co JSC (Arabic: شركة الاجنحة الليبية), or Libyan Wings (Arabic: الأجنحة الليبية), is an airline with its head office on the grounds of ben ashour in Tripoli, Libya. It started operations in September 2015 after facing delays because of political instability in Libya. As of January 2020, the airline operates four Airbus A319s to four destinations in Libya, Tunisia and Turkey.

It is banned from flying into the EU.

== History ==
In June 2013, ch-aviation reported that Libyan Wings intended to start operations in November of that year. In November 2013, the airline signed a memorandum of understanding with Airbus for three Airbus A350-900s and four Airbus A320neos; the anticipated launch date was shifted to early 2014. In May 2014, Libyan Wings signed to lease two Airbus A319s from a Dubai-based company, planning to begin flights later in the year. However, because of the deteriorating political situation in Libya, the airline had to delay its launch further. While it waited for conditions to improve, Libyan Wings retained its Airbus A319s rather than return them to the lessor, even though this action was costly.

In order to obtain its air operator's certificate, the airline had to conduct a proving flight with passengers. Because Tripoli was still unsafe, Libyan Wings operated its proving flight in Turkey with Libyan Civil Aviation Authority officials on board. The airline commenced operations on 21 September 2015 with a flight from Tripoli to Istanbul. Four days later, Turkey required all Libyan citizens to have a visa before entering the country; Libyan Wings had to suspend operations while its passengers traveled to the Turkish consulate in Misrata, 200 kilometres (120 mi) away, to obtain their visas.

Flights to Tunis began in October 2015, and Istanbul operations have since resumed. As of October 2016, the memorandum of understanding with Airbus is still in effect, although the order has not been finalised yet.

== Corporate affairs ==
Libyan Wings is headquartered in Tripoli, and its chief executive officer is Mohammed madi. The airline has at least ten investors. (Note: The Libyan government prohibits a party from holding more than a 10% stake in an airline. Libyan Wings has not indicated exactly how many investors it has, but it has said that they are all businessmen.) As of November 2016, the airline has between 120 and 130 employees. The majority of customers are Libyan citizens and are travelling for business purposes.

== Destinations ==
As of August 2022, Libyan Wings operates scheduled flights to the destinations:

Country	City	Airport	Notes	Refs
Libya	Tripoli	Mitiga International Airport	Hub	
Libya	Misrata	Misrata International Airport		
Libya	Sabha	Sabha Airport		
Libya	Tobruk	Tobruk Airport		
Libya	Benghazi	Benina International Airport		
Tunisia	Tunis	Tunis Carthage International Airport		
Tunisia	Sfax	Sfax Thyna International Airport		
Tunisia	Monastir	Habib Bourguiba International Airport		
Turkey	Istanbul	Istanbul Airport		
Saudi Arabia	Jeddah	King Abdulaziz International Airport	Seasonal	
Saudi Arabia	Medina	Prince Mohammad bin Abdulaziz International Airport	Seasonal	

=== Interline agreements ===
- Hahn Air

== Fleet ==
=== Current fleet ===
As of July 2026, Libyan Wings operates the following aircraft:

Libyan Wings fleet
Aircraft	In service	Orders	Passengers			Notes
Aircraft	In service	Orders	C	Y	Total	Notes
Airbus A319	4	—	12	108	120	
Total	4	—				

=== Former fleet ===
As of August 2025, Libyan Wings operated 4 Airbus A319.
