= Afriqiyah Airways Flight 209 =

2016 aircraft hijacking in Malta

Coordinates: 35°51′27″N 014°28′39″E

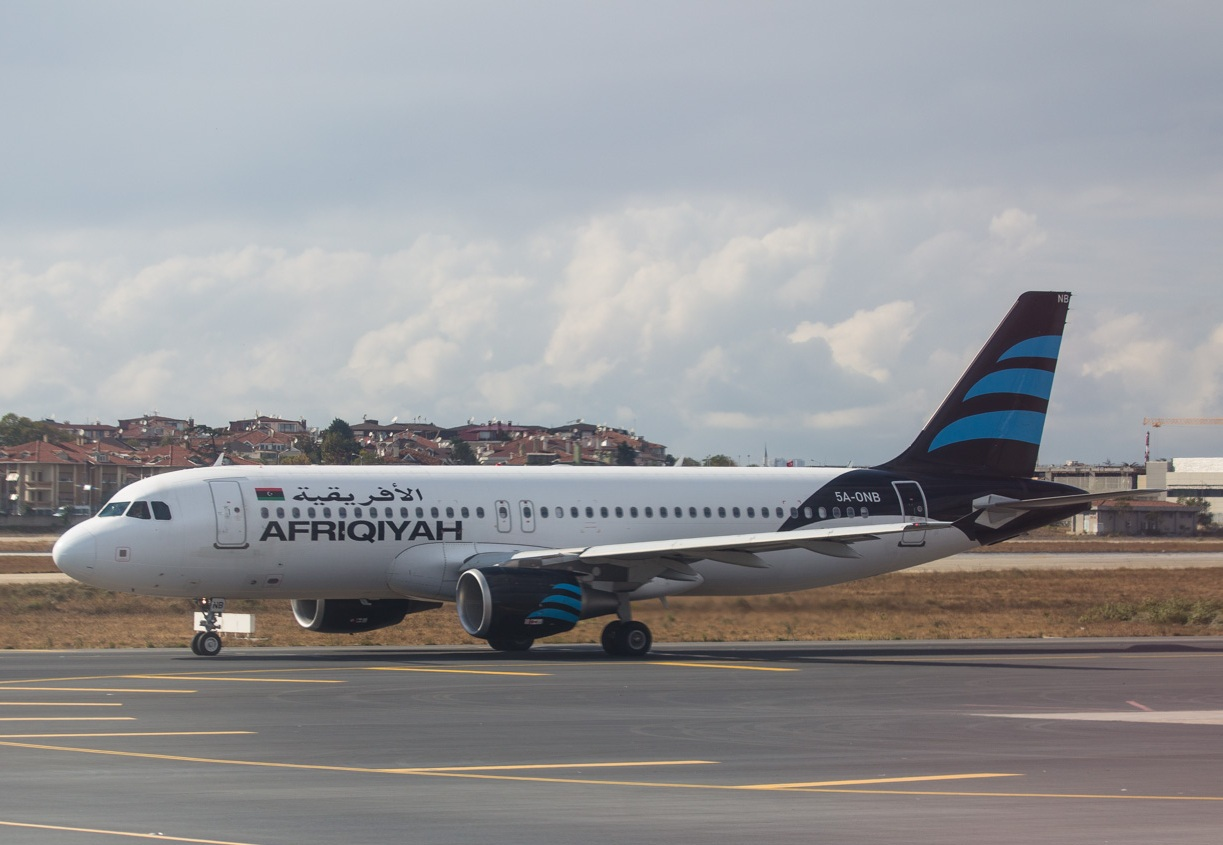
- 5A-ONB, the aircraft involved in the hijacking, photographed in September 2016

Hijacking
- Date: 23 December 2016
- Summary: Hijacking
- Site: Malta International Airport, Luqa, Malta

Aircraft
- Aircraft type: Airbus A320-214
- Operator: Afriqiyah Airways
- IATA flight No.: 8U209
- ICAO flight No.: AAW209
- Call sign: AFRIQIYAH 209
- Registration: 5A-ONB
- Flight origin: Sabha Airport, Libya
- Destination: Mitiga International Airport, Libya
- Occupants: 118
- Passengers: 111
- Crew: 7
- Fatalities: 0
- Survivors: 118

Afriqiyah Airways Flight 209 was a domestic passenger flight from Sabha to Tripoli, Libya that was hijacked on 23 December 2016 and made a forced landing in Luqa, Malta. The flight was operated by an Airbus A320 owned by Afriqiyah Airways, Libya's state airline, and carried 111 passengers: 82 males, 28 females and one infant. The two hijackers later released all of the hostages and surrendered to the authorities.

== Aircraft ==
The aircraft involved was an Airbus A320-214, registration 5A-ONB, msn 3236. The aircraft was equipped with two CFM International CFM56 engines.

== Hijacking ==
The aircraft, carrying seven crew and 111 passengers, had taken off from Sabha International Airport at 08:10 local time and was due to land at Tripoli at 09:20. The two hijackers threatened to blow up the aircraft with hand grenades, according to Malta state television. One hijacker declared himself to be "pro-Gaddafi" and that he would release all passengers, but not the crew, if his unknown demands were accepted. The pilots had tried to land in Libya, but the hijackers refused their request. The aircraft was forced to land at Malta International Airport at 11:32 am local time. The aircraft's engines were still running after it was surrounded by the Maltese military. One hijacker was reported to have appeared at the aircraft door waving a large green flag similar to the Libyan flag under Gaddafi. He then put the flag down and returned inside.

== Response ==
Negotiating teams were placed on standby and Maltese military units arrived at the airport. Upon landing, at least 25 passengers had been released by the two hijackers, and negotiations were held. Following the release of all passengers and crew, the hijackers, Suhah Mussa and Ahmed Ali, surrendered to the Maltese authorities and were taken into custody.

== Aftermath ==
On 2 December 2020, Suhah Mussa was sentenced to 25 years' imprisonment and fined €9,990 after he pleaded guilty to the charges against him.

== See also ==
- List of aircraft hijackings
- EgyptAir Flight 181
