= Ghat Airport =

Ghat Airport مطار غات
- IATA: GHT; ICAO: HLGT

Summary
- Airport type: Public/Military
- Location: Ghat, Libya
- Elevation AMSL: 2,296 ft / 700 m
- Coordinates: 25°08′20″N 10°08′40″E

Map
- Location within Libya

Runways
Direction	Length		Surface
Direction	m	ft	Surface
17/35	4,020	13,189	Asphalt
06/24	2,125	6,972	Asphalt
- Source: GCM SkyVector

Ghat Airport (IATA: GHT, ICAO: HLGT) is an airport 18 kilometres (11 mi) north of Ghat, the capital of Ghat District in southwestern Libya, located just east of the Algerian border.

== Airlines and destinations ==
Airlines	Destinations
Afriqiyah Airways	Tripoli–Mitiga
Libyan Airlines	Tripoli–Mitiga

== See also ==
- Transport in Libya
- List of airports in Libya
