= Alexandria International Airport (Egypt) =

International airport serving Alexandria, Egypt

Alexandria International Airport مطار الإسكندرية الدولي

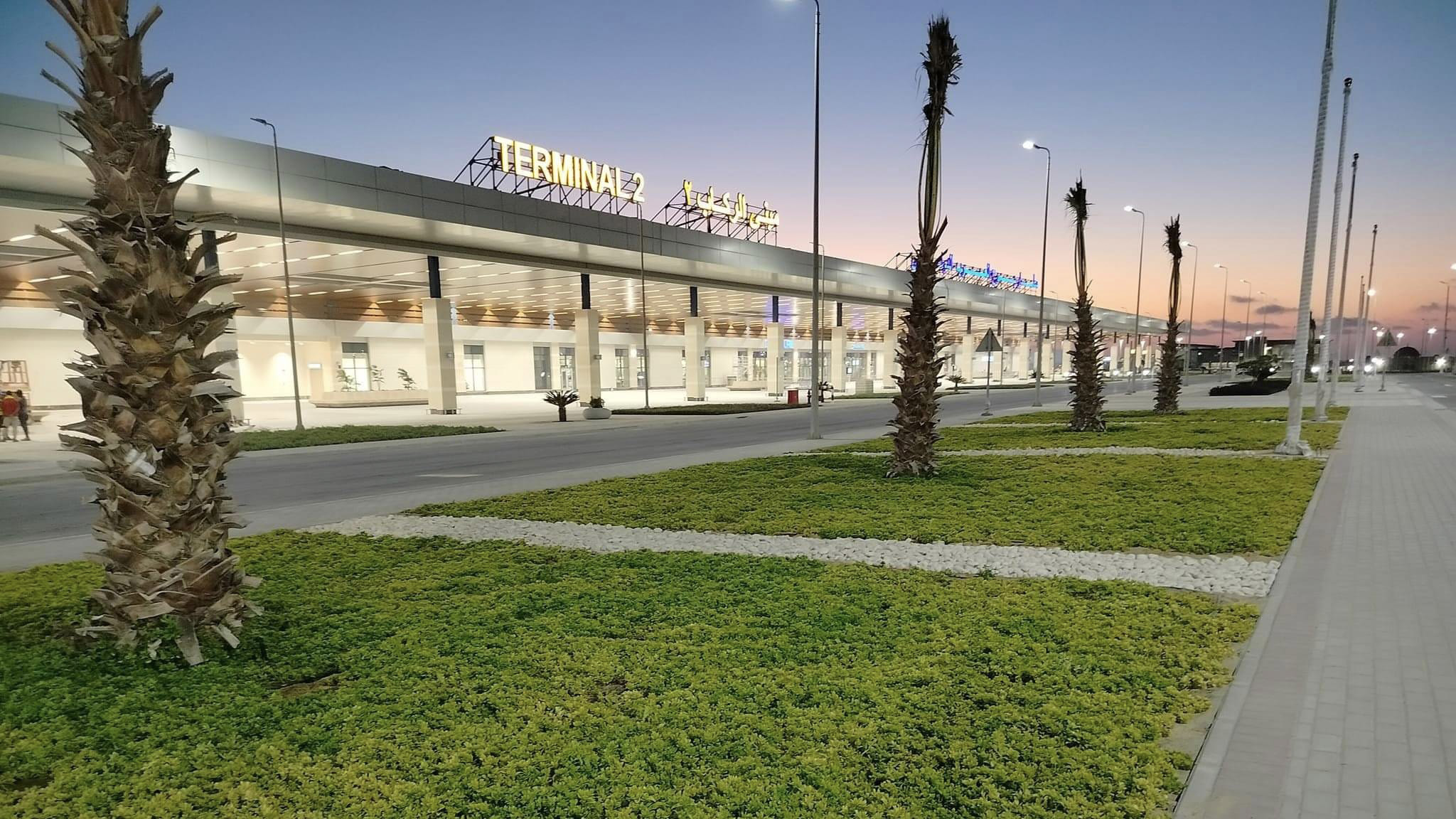
- IATA: ALY; ICAO: HEAX

Summary
- Airport type: Public
- Owner/Operator: Egyptian Airports Company (EAC)
- Serves: Alexandria; Nile Delta
- Location: Amreya
- Opened: February 2010; 16 years ago
- Focus city for: Egyptair
- Operating base for: Air Arabia Egypt
- Elevation AMSL: 54 m (177 ft)
- Coordinates: 30°55′04″N 29°41′47″E

Maps
- Location of airport in Egypt
- Interactive map of Alexandria International Airport

Runways
Direction	Length		Surface
Direction	m	ft	Surface
14L/32R	3,400	11,156	Asphalt
14R/32L	3,400	11,156	Asphalt
- Source: DAFIF

Alexandria International Airport (IATA: ALY, ICAO: HEAX), formerly Borg El Arab International Airport, is an international airport of Alexandria, Egypt. It is located about 40 km (25 mi) southwest of Alexandria, in Borg El Arab. The airport also serves the nearby areas of the Nile Delta.

== History ==
Borg El Arab International Airport was planned to relieve pressure on El Nouzha Airport, which could not accommodate large aircraft due to the marshy terrain and obstacles from surrounding unauthorized buildings. In early 1998, the Civil Aviation Authority began exploring the establishment of a new international airport in the Borg El Arab area, west of Alexandria, on land previously belonging to the Borg El Arab Air Base. A total area of approximately 5.5 km by 2.5 km was allocated for the new civil airport. A consulting firm was commissioned to design the airport, and temporary facilities were initially constructed to serve as an interim international airport until the permanent airport could be completed.

In June 2009, the government announced plans for a 390-acre (1.6 km²) urban expansion to the west of Alexandria, later referred to as New Alexandria. The project was planned to be connected to Borg El Arab International Airport by a ring road, with an estimated travel time of 25 minutes.

The terminal 1 building was officially opened in 2010. Its inauguration, presided over during that year, included the completion of the airport’s new passenger terminal, making it operational for handling flights. At the time of its opening, Borg El Arab International Airport began serving as a modern aviation hub for Alexandria, accommodating both domestic and international air traffic. The building has a capacity to handle 1.2 million passengers per year, and was an adequate replacement to El Nouzha Airport.

In January 2012, the Ministry of Civil Aviation closed El Nouzha Airport to air traffic and transferred its flights to Borg El Arab International Airport. In January 2015, the Saudi Binladin Group won the contract to develop the passenger terminal at El Nouzha Airport, after submitting the lowest financial bid of EGP 280 million and the best technical offer. Extensive renovations and upgrades were made, including improvements to buildings, installation of modern equipment, solar energy integration, and measures to manage groundwater accumulation on the low-lying site. The airport’s terminal had been upgraded to handle one million passengers annually, compared with its previous capacity of 300,000, in order to reduce congestion at Borg El Arab International Airport. Despite these investments, plans to reopen Nouzha Airport were ultimately deemed unfeasible, and its historical buildings have been preserved while the site’s future use remains under consideration.

The Egyptian Holding Company for Airports announced plans in 2016 to construct a new terminal at the airport, with funding from the Japan Bank for International Cooperation. On 1 January 2025, airline operations at the airport was moved from the old terminal to the new terminal, termed the first "green airport" terminal in Africa. The terminal covers 40,000 square meters and has an annual capacity of 4.8 million passengers, increasing the airport’s total capacity to 6 million. It incorporates solar energy generation, energy-efficient VRV air conditioning systems, and measures to reduce carbon emissions and optimize water and energy use. The transfer of airline operations was overseen by the Chairman of the Egyptian Airports Company.

The roads surrounding Borg El Arab International Airport were upgraded in connection with the inauguration of terminal 2. The improvements included the development of the main access route linking Alexandria and the northern coast of Egypt to the airport via Abu Zikry Axis. The road, 35 meters wide, connects the Cairo–Alexandria desert road to the Sidi Kerir–Airport road. Works involved 22 culverts totaling 4,500 meters, extensive landscaping with 2,000 palm trees and 2,600 olive trees along the median and surrounding areas, as well as the cleaning of drainage systems. Additionally, the Sidi Kerir Bridge was expanded to 638 meters long and 40 meters wide, accommodating nine traffic lanes in each direction, including service lanes, with 755 lighting columns installed along the route.

In August 2025, Alexandria Governorate, in coordination with the Ministry of Civil Aviation, announced that the airport would be renamed Alexandria International Airport, replacing its previous name, Borg El Arab International Airport, and that the airport’s International Civil Aviation Organization (ICAO) code would be updated from HEBA to HEAX. The change took effect on 4 September 2025.

== Terminal 1 ==
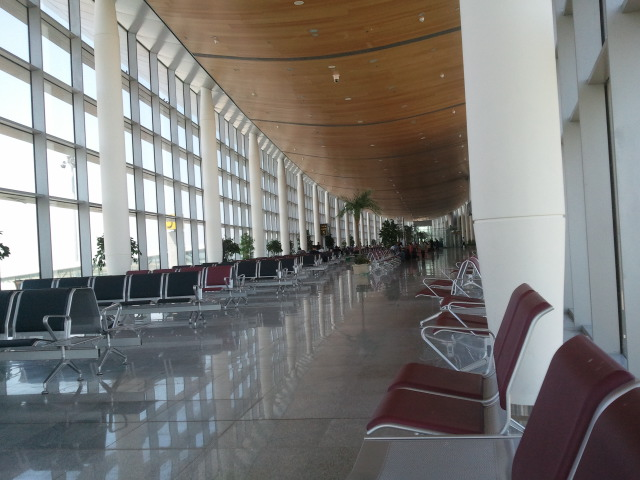
Departures area in terminal 1

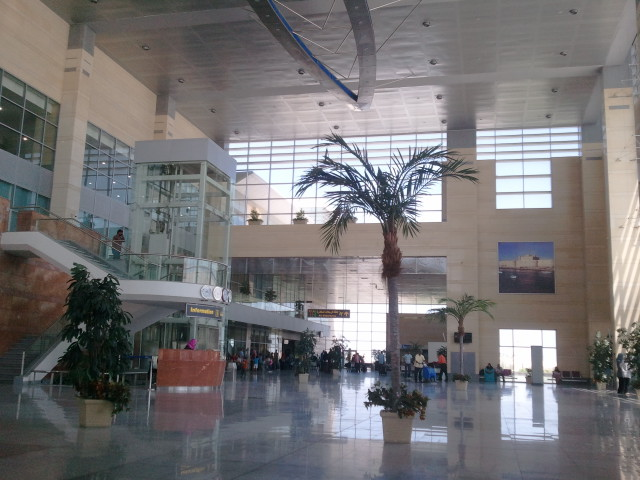
Check-in hall in terminal 1

Terminal 1, opened in 2010, covers an area of 24,000 square meters and includes an international departure hall, a transit corridor, an arrivals hall, a baggage claim area, and temporary facilities for receiving and seeing off passengers.

The passenger terminal, designed in the shape of a boat, has three floors. The ground floor is used for check-in and luggage handling, the second floor accommodates arrivals for both domestic and international flights as well as administrative and airline offices, and the third floor serves departures, including immigration procedures and a VIP hall. Commercial facilities, such as shops and services, are distributed across all three floors. Four movable boarding bridges connect the terminal to aircraft.

The terminal also includes a duty-free shop, a franchise food court, areas for travel agencies and related services, a fuel supply unit, a control tower, and a fire station for on-site emergencies. A parking area in front of the terminal provides space for 350 vehicles.

== Terminal 2 ==
Terminal 2, inaugurated in 2025, covers 40,000 square meters and features a 120,000-square-meter tarmac capable of accommodating 16 medium-sized aircraft. The building was designed to environmentally friendly, featuring solar power for daytime electricity, energy-efficient VRV air conditioning, LED lighting, extensive use of natural light, and noise-reducing construction materials. It includes parking for 1,000 cars, 51 minibuses, and 15 buses, as well as service buildings comprising three power stations, a wastewater treatment plant, a maintenance workshop for airport equipment, a water pumping station, and a water tank.

The terminal has 40 check-in counters, 40 passport counters across arrival and departure halls, and five baggage carousels in the arrivals hall. Security and operational systems include modern surveillance cameras and advanced baggage handling systems with CTX devices. Passenger amenities include cafeterias, restaurants, and commercial areas, along with designated waiting areas for departing and arriving passengers.

== Airlines and destinations ==
Airlines	Destinations
Aegean Airlines	Athens
Afriqiyah Airways	Benghazi, Misrata, Tripoli–Mitiga
Air Arabia	Abu Dhabi, Amman–City, Dammam, Jeddah, Riyadh, Sharjah, Ta'if; Seasonal: Bergamo
Air Cairo	Amman–City, Amman–Queen Alia, Athens, Jeddah, Kuwait City, Riyadh; Seasonal: Casablanca, Sharjah, Sharm El Sheikh
Crown Airlines	Tripoli–Mitiga
Egyptair	Benghazi, Cairo, Dammam, Dubai–International, Jeddah, Kuwait City, Medina, Riyadh; Seasonal: Hurghada, Sharm El Sheikh
Flyadeal	Jeddah
Flydubai	Dubai–International
Jazeera Airways	Kuwait City
Kuwait Airways	Kuwait City
Libyan Airlines	Benghazi, Tripoli–Mitiga
Pegasus Airlines	Istanbul–Sabiha Gökçen
Petroleum Air Services	Charter: Cairo
Qatar Airways	Doha
Saudia	Jeddah, Medina, Riyadh
Turkish Airlines	Istanbul
Wizz Air	Rome–Fiumicino

== See also ==
- List of airports in Egypt
- El Nouzha Airport
- Transportation in Alexandria
- List of the busiest airports in the Middle East
