= Air Mediterranean =

Greek airline

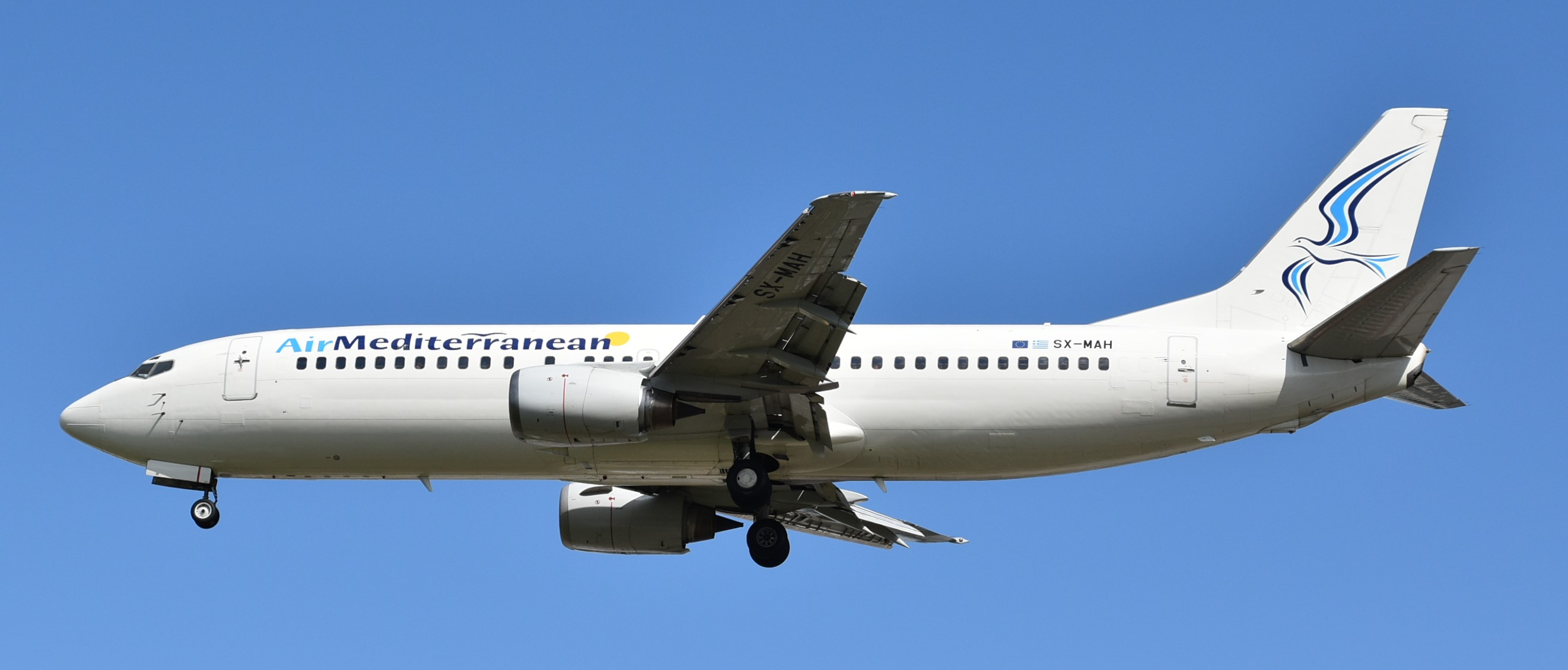
- Boeing 737-400
IATA	ICAO	Call sign
MV	MAR	HELLASMED
- Founded: 1 September 2015
- Commenced operations: 1 November 2017
- Operating bases: Athens International Airport
- Fleet size: 2
- Destinations: 12
- Headquarters: Glyfada, Greece
- Website: air-mediterranean.com

Air Mediterranean is a Greek charter airline headquartered in Athens and based at Athens International Airport.

== History ==
In January 2017 Air Mediterranean obtained its air operator's certificate (AOC), under the Hellenic Civil Aviation Authority in accordance with the European Aviation Safety Agency (EASA) Regulation.

The airline's plan was to cover the gaps between countries with poor or no connectivity, linking Europe with the rapidly expanding markets of the Middle East and Africa, using Athens as a hub. Air Mediterranean commenced scheduled passenger operations on 1 November 2017. However, on 18 January 2018, the airline suspended all flights until further notice. In February 2018, the airline announced it would cease all scheduled operations and focus on charter operations instead.

== Destinations ==
This list of Air Mediterranean destinations includes the city, country, and the airport's name, with the airline's hub marked.

Country	City	Airport	Notes	Notes
Austria	Vienna	Vienna International Airport		
Bulgaria	Varna	Varna Airport	Seasonal	
Croatia	Split	Split Airport	Seasonal	
Czech Republic	Prague	Václav Havel Airport Prague	Seasonal	
Germany	Berlin	Berlin Brandenburg Airport		
Germany	Cologne	Cologne Bonn Airport		
Germany	Düsseldorf	Düsseldorf Airport		
Greece	Athens	Athens International Airport	Base	
Greece	Corfu	Corfu International Airport	Seasonal	
Greece	Rhodes	Rhodes International Airport	Seasonal	
Italy	Forlì	Forlì Airport	Base	
Libya	Benghazi	Benina International Airport		
Spain	Palma de Mallorca	Palma de Mallorca Airport	Seasonal	
Sweden	Stockholm	Stockholm Arlanda Airport		
Syria	Damascus	Damascus International Airport		
United Arab Emirates	Dubai	Al Maktoum International Airport		

== Fleet ==
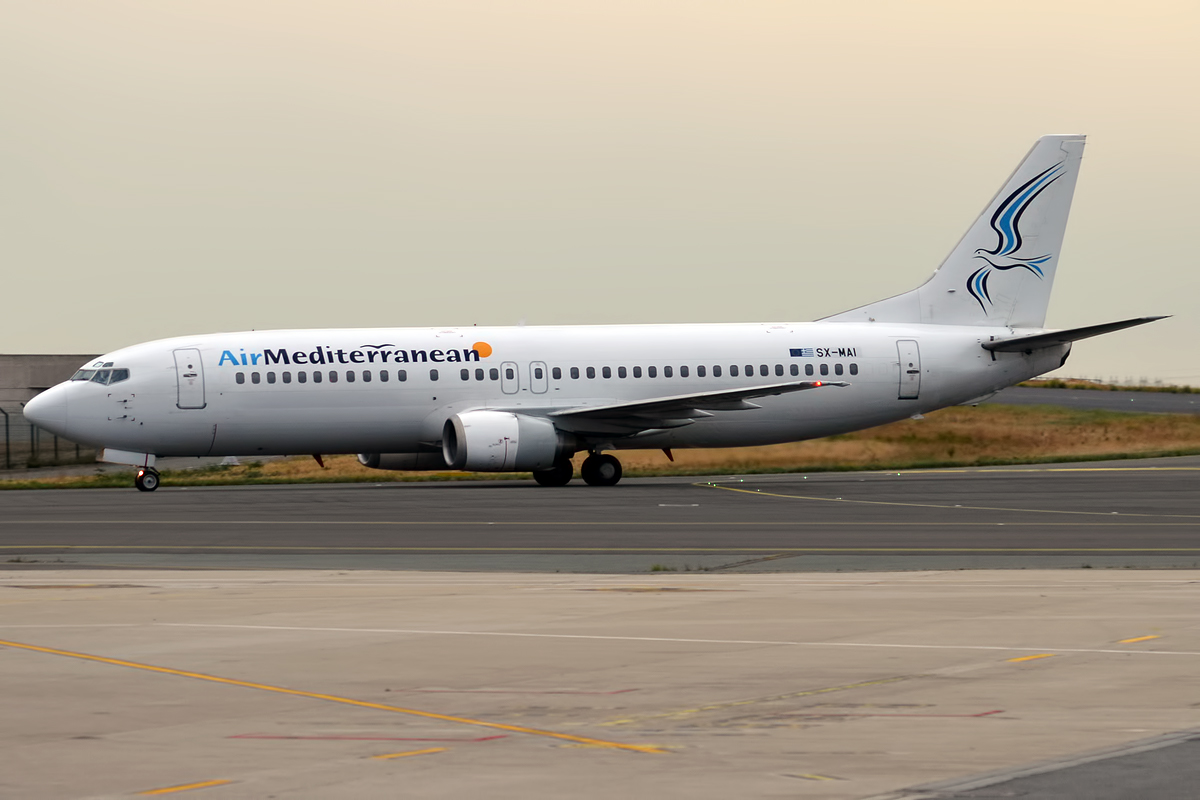
Air Mediterranean Boeing 737-400

=== Current fleet ===
As of July 2026, Air Mediterranean operates the following aircraft:

Air Mediterranean fleet
Aircraft	In service	Orders	Passengers			Notes/sources
Aircraft	In service	Orders	C	Y	Total	Notes/sources
Boeing 737-400	2			168	168	
Total	2	—				

=== Former fleet ===
As of August 2025, Air Mediterranean operated 2 Boeing 737-400.

Air Mediterranean also previously operated the following aircraft:

- 1 further Boeing 737-400
