= Al Abraq International Airport =

Airport in the eastern Libyan city of Bayda

Al Bayda - Al abraq Airport مطار الأبرق الدولي
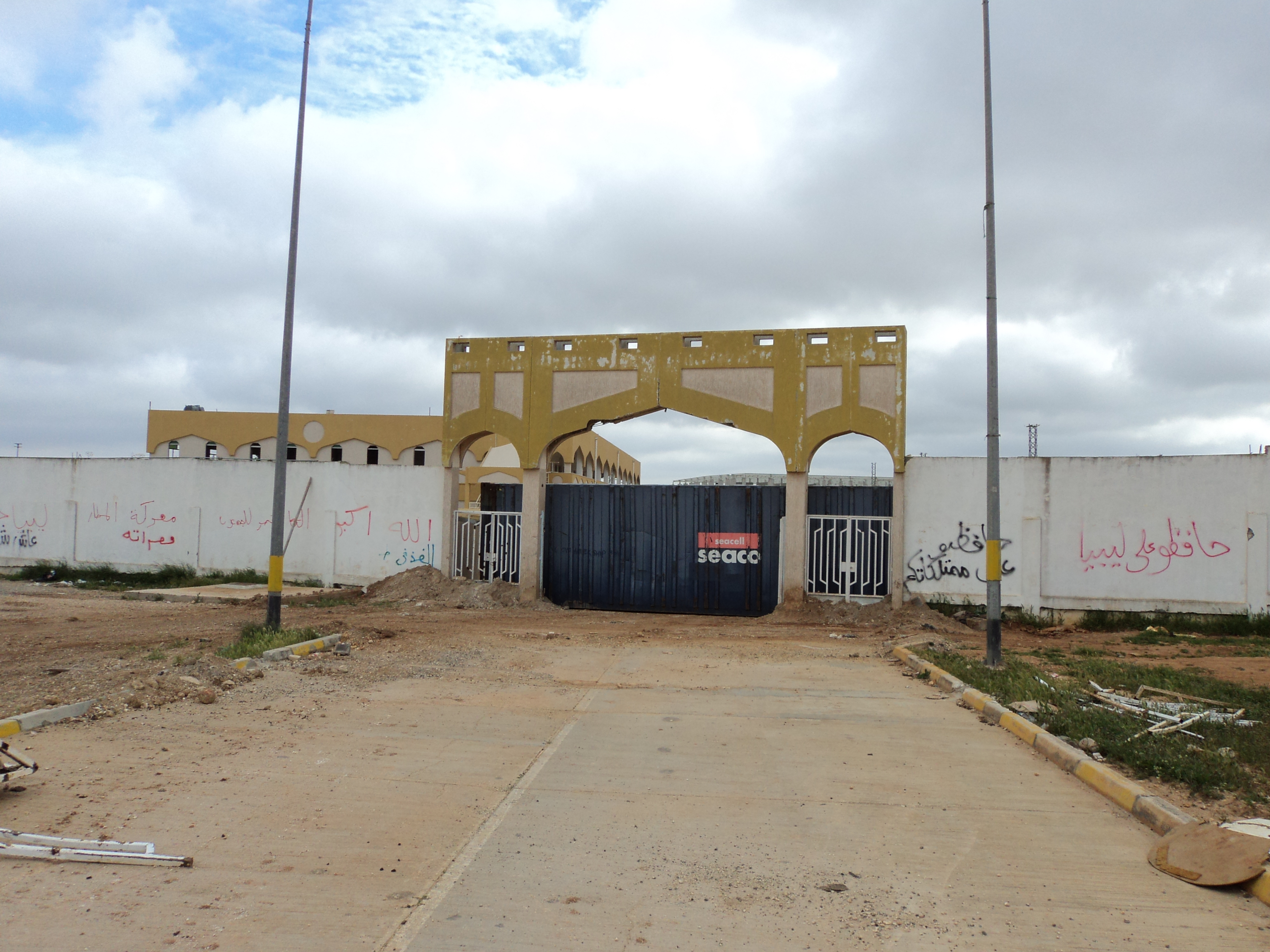
- IATA: LAQ; ICAO: HLLQ

Summary
- Airport type: Public/Military
- Serves: Bayda, Libya
- Location: Al Abraq
- Elevation AMSL: 2,157 ft / 657 m
- Coordinates: 32°47′19″N 21°57′51″E

Map
- Location of La Abraq International Airport

Runways
Direction	Length		Surface
Direction	m	ft	Surface
10/28	3,600	11,811	Asphalt
03/21	1,836	6,024	Asphalt
- Source: SkyVector GCM

Al Abraq International Airport or Al Bayda International Airport is an airport serving the eastern Libyan city of Bayda. The airport is 16 kilometres (9.9 mi) east of Bayda, 16 km west of the town of Al Abraq, and 12 kilometres (7.5 mi) south of Libya's Mediterranean coast. The airport is also known as El Beida International Airport or Airport International El Beida la Abraq.

The Labraq non-directional beacon (Ident: LAB) is located on the field.

== Airlines and destinations ==
Airlines	Destinations
Afriqiyah Airways	Tripoli–Mitiga
Libyan Airlines	Tripoli–Mitiga

== See also ==
- Transport in Libya
- List of airports in Libya
