= Sabha Airport =

Sabha International Airport
- IATA: SEB; ICAO: HLLS

Summary
- Airport type: Public/Military
- Operator: Civil Aviation and Meteorology Bureau
- Serves: Sabha, Libya
- Elevation AMSL: 1,427 ft / 435 m
- Coordinates: 27°00′00″N 14°27′40″E

Map
- Location within Libya

Runways
Direction	Length		Surface
Direction	m	ft	Surface
13/31	3,600	11,811	Asphalt
- Sources: GCM SkyVector

Sebha International Airport (IATA: SEB, ICAO: HLLS) is an airport serving Sabha, capital of the Sabha District of Libya. The airport is 4 kilometres (2.5 mi) southeast of the city.

The airport shares its runway with Sabha Airbase, which has operations on the southwest side of the airport.

== Plans ==
The airport underwent expansion in the 1970s to upgrade it to an international airport.

A LD600 million contract was signed (20 May 2008) with a joint venture comprising Lebanon's CCC and a new Libyan investment and development company for a new passenger terminal at Sabha Airport. It would have a capacity of 3 million passengers, and, like the new terminals at Tripoli International and Benina International, be designed by Aéroports de Paris Engineering. This development was not completed due to the Libyan Civil War.

In March 2017, it was announced that the airport had reopened to commercial traffic after closing in 2014 due to the continuing civil war.

== Airlines and destinations ==
Airlines	Destinations
Afriqiyah Airways	Benghazi
Fly Oya	Tripoli–Mitiga
Libyan Wings	Tripoli–Mitiga
MedSky Airways	Tripoli–Mitiga

== See also ==
- Transport in Libya
- List of airports in Libya
- Sabha Airbase
