= Benina International Airport =

Airport in Benina, Libya

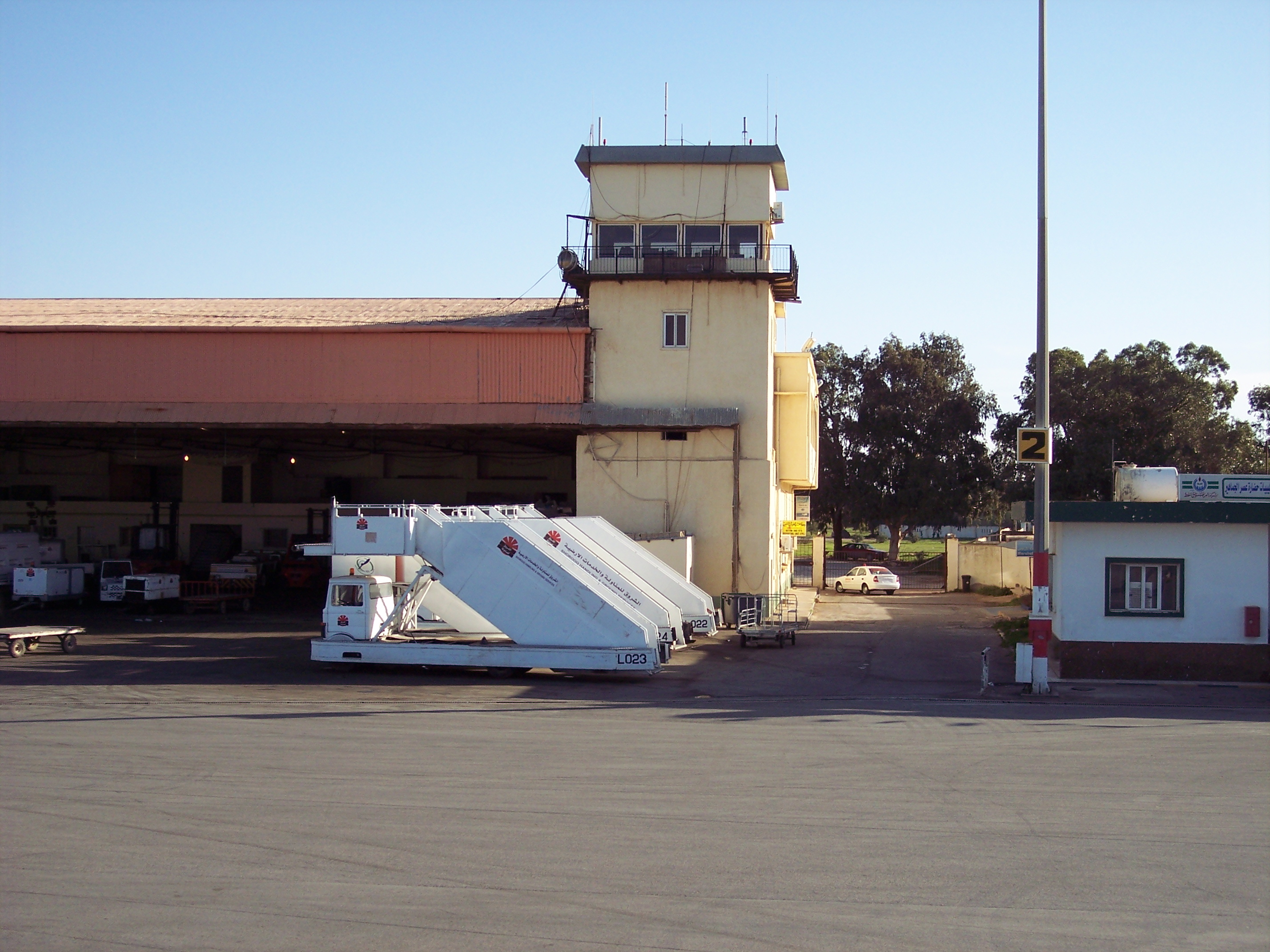
- IATA: BEN; ICAO: HLLB

Summary
- Airport type: Public/Military
- Operator: Civil Aviation and Meteorology Bureau
- Serves: Benghazi, Libya
- Location: Benina
- Hub for: Buraq Air; Libyan Airlines; Berniq Airways
- Elevation AMSL: 433 ft (132 m)
- Coordinates: 32°05′50″N 20°16′10″E

Map
- Location within Libya

Runways
Direction	Length		Surface
Direction	m	ft	Surface
15R/33L	3,600	11,811	Asphalt
15L/33R	3,600	11,811	Asphalt
- Sources: WAD, GCM SkyVector

Benina International Airport (IATA: BEN, ICAO: HLLB) (Arabic: مطار بنينا الدولي) serves Benghazi, Libya. It is located in the borough of Benina, 19 kilometres (12 mi) east of Benghazi, from which it takes its name. The airport is operated by the Civil Aviation and Meteorology Bureau of Libya and is the second largest in the country after Tripoli International Airport. Benina was a critical airport during the North African Campaign of World War II. Benina International is also the secondary hub of both Buraq Air and flag carrier, Libyan Airlines. In July 2014 all flights to the airport were suspended due to fighting in the area. Three years later, in July 2017, the airport was reopened for limited commercial flights and as of 2025 there are multiple international flights to and from the airport.

== History ==
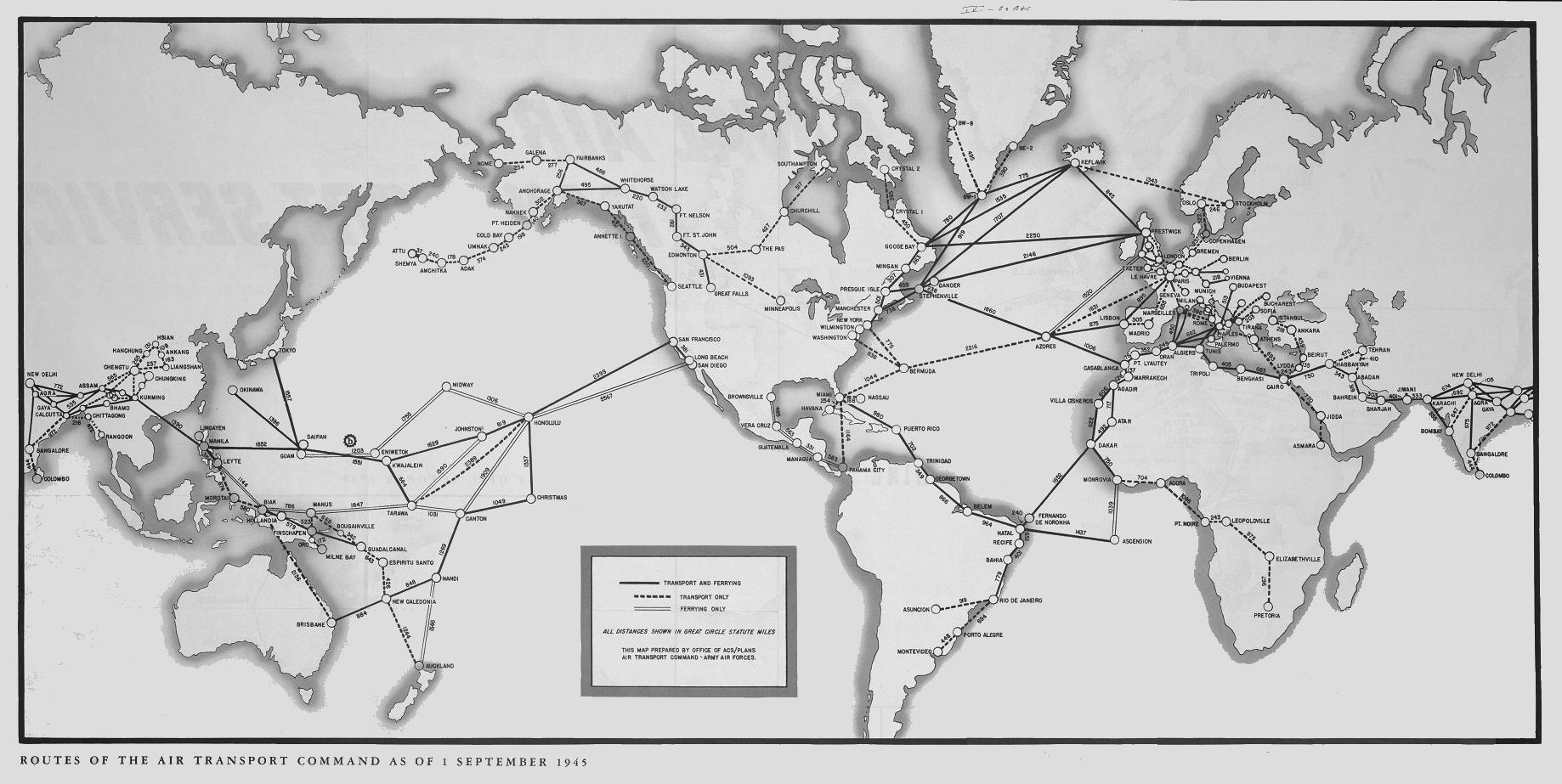
USAF Air Transport Command Routes, 1 September 1945

At the conclusion of the Italo-Turkish War in 1912 with the Treaty of Lausanne the Ottoman Empire ceded control of Libya to Italy. The Italians then established administrative regions, with Italian Triolitania in the northwest.

While there are scant records of the establishment of an airport in Benghazi / Benina, Italy began expanding infrastructure and their new colony, including railroads during the 1910s - 1920s. In order to support various military campaigns, the Italian Corpo Aeronautico Miltare (Military Aviation Corps) built various facilities to extend control, including the Benina airport on the outskirts of Benghazi. The aviation facilities included airfields, landing grounds and emergency landing grounds. Many of these facilities were only open plots of desert land with markers and minimal or no structures, often utilizing tents for shelter. The Luftwaffe took a special interest in Benina, receiving the most improvements out of all of the facilities in Libya.

The airport was on the Imperial Line of the Italian national airline Ala Littoria between 1935 and 1941.

During the Second Italio-Abyssian War, the Italians were reported to have used Benina to store sulphur mustard chemical weapons, later found by the British.

=== World War II ===
During World War II the Italian Regia Aeronatica (successor to the Corpo Aeronautico Miltare) used Benina as a base. By 1941, the airbase had a single 1100 m x 230 m firm clay runway, and it was equipped for night landings. There were nine underground and eight above ground fuel tanks, with a fuel dump 8 km outside of the base as well as a munitions dump. There were administrative buildings, officer quarters and 34 huts for ground personnel. There was also a satellite field (Benina South) 1.5 km south of the main base, with a 1680 m x 1110 m clay surface runway.

List of Italian Units:

- 7º Gruppo Comb (Sep-Nov 40)
- 10º Gruppo CT (Jun 40)
- 12º Gruppo Assalto (Jun, Dec 40)
- 16º Gruppo Assalto (Dec 40); 17º Gruppo CT (Nov 41)
- 30º Gruppo BT (Jun-Jul 40)
- 32º Gruppo BT (Jun 40)
- 33º Gruppo BT (Aug-Sep, Dec 40)
- 35º Gruppo BT (Sep-Oct 40)
- 36º Gruppo BT (Sep-Oct 40)
- 46º Gruppo BT (Jun 40)
- 47º Gruppo BT (Jun 40)
- 52º Gruppo BT (Dec 40)
- 53º Gruppo BT (Dec 40)
- 54º Gruppo Autonomo BT (Dec 40);
- 59º Gruppo BT (Oct 40 – Apr 41?)
- 60º Gruppo BT (Oct 40 – Apr 41?)
- 67º Gruppo OA (Sep 40)

Italian aircraft at the base included SM.79 medium bombers, CR.32 biplanes and SM.81 transport/bombers.

As the German military became more involved in the North African Campaign, the Luftwaffe had more of a presence at Benina. They made general improvements to the field and based multiple different units and aircraft at the field.

List of German Units:

- detachment of 2.(F)/Aufkl.Gr. 123 (Mar-Jun 41)
- III./LG 1 (MayJun, Nov-Dec 41)
- elements of KG z.b.V. 172 (May 41)
- III./ZG 26 (Sep 41)
- 10./KG z.b.V. 1 (Sep, Nov-Dec 41)
- Stab/LG 1 (Nov 41)
- I./LG 1 (Nov 41)
- II./LG 1 (Nov 41)
- II./St.G. 2 (Nov 41)
- I./St.G. 3 (Nov 41)
- 8./JG 53 (Dec 41)
- 1. St. of I./St.G. 1 (Oct-Dec 41)
- part of Stabsstaffel Fliegerführer Afrika (Dec 41)
- detachment of I./NJG 2 (Dec 41, 1942)
- 1.(F)/Aufkl.Gr. 121 (Jan-Feb 42)
- 12.(Einsatz-)/LG 1 (Jan-Feb 42)
- I./JG 27 (Feb 42)
- II./JG 27 (Feb 42)
- II./JG 27 (Feb 42)

German aircraft stationed at the base included Ju 52 transports, Ju 88 bombers, Bf 110 fighters and Bf 109 fighters.

During the North African campaign, control of the area see-sawed between Axis and Allied forces until the British finally captured the entire Benghazi area for good at the end of 1942. When Marshall Tedder visited Benina in January 1942 during a brief period of British control, he witnessed "...an extraordinary sight, littered with aircraft...in all stages of repair and disrepair...deliberately demolished...others equally knocked out by our bombing and low shoot-ups". The British SAS made attacks in the Benghazi area (Operation Bigamy), including at Benina, reportedly destroying several aircraft. However, other reports indicate these raids were a failure, and that the Germans may have sabotaged the aircraft.

After the Allies successful pushed the Axis forces out of western Libya, the United States Army Air Forces (USAAF) Ninth Air Force began to use the airport. They arrived in February 1943, with the IX Bomber Command flying their first mission that same month against Naples. As part of the IX Bomber Command, the 376th Bombardment Group was stationed at Benina. This group was equipped with B-24 Liberator bombers. It participated in Operation Tidal Wave, the US attack on the Ploesti oil refineries in August 1943.

Italian Arditi paratroopers made an airborne attack that destroyed some Allied aircraft in June 1943.

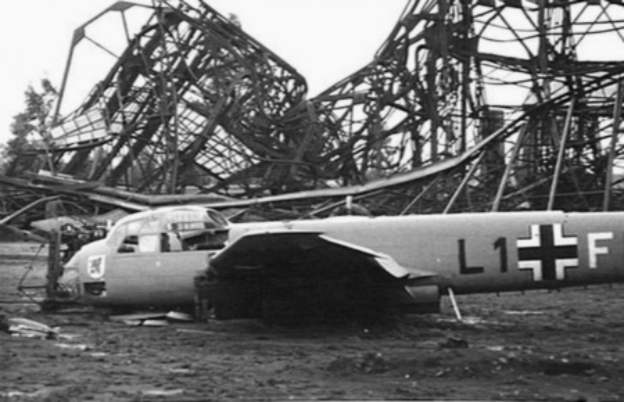
A damaged German Junkers Ju 88A-4 in front of a destroyed hangar at Benina, Libya.

The Royal Air Force (RAF) established the No. 351 Squadron and No. 352 Squadron at Benina in 1944. These units were the first all Yugoslav-crewed fighter unit to be formed in Africa, and flew Hawker Hurricanes and Supermarine Spitfire fighters before transferring other theatres in the Fall of 1944.

Once the combat units moved west, Benina was used as a logistics hub by Air Transport Command. It functioned as a stopover between Payne Field near Cairo or to Mellaha Field near Tripoli on the North African Cairo-Dakar transport route for cargo, transiting aircraft and personnel.

==== Berca, Lete and Soluch Airfields ====
Part of a group of airports in the Benghazi region, Benina is frequently (incorrectly) referenced as Soluch Airfield during the USAAF usage. Soluch (alternatively spelled Suluq) is 60 km to the south of Benina. Soluch was a landing ground with minimal facilities and infrequently used by the Axis. The USAAF possibly intended to develop Soluch into a major airbase, but due to accessibility issues it was dropped without any major improvements. Given their close proximity and movement of units between the two airfields, many sources confabulate Soluch with Benina as the airport associated with the missing B-24 "Lady Be Good".

In addition to Soluch, there are other airfields located in the Benghazi region that are associated (or misidentified) with Benina, including Lete Airfield (10 km east of Benghazi) and Berca Airfield, located in the Al Birkah suburb of Benghazi.

=== Post War ===
At the end of the war, the USAAF closed all of their bases surrounding Benghazi.

By 1953, British military maintained airbases in three locations, including Tripoli, El Adem and Benina. In March of 1970, the last British troops had been expelled from the country, including those station at Benina. This coincided with the planned withdrawal of the US military from Wheelus Air Base. Prior to this, the US conducted a survey to expanding the Royal Libyan Air Force to two bases, including at Benina.

In 1986, as part of Operation El Dorado Canyon, aircraft from the USAF 48th Tactical Fighter Wing, based in the United Kingdom, launched at attack on multiple targets, including Benina and Tripoli airports. According to reports, "Damage at both airfields was heavy - two transport aircraft destroyed and 12 damaged, two helicopters destroyed and 10 to 15 damaged, and as many as 14 MiG23s destroyed. The runways were also heavily cratered."

==== Expansion ====
A new terminal with a capacity of 5 million passengers was to be developed north of the existing runway at Benina International under a 720 million LYD (€415 million) first-stage contract awarded to Canada's SNC-Lavalin as of 2008. The final cost was estimated at 1.1 billion LYD (€630 million).

As with Tripoli International Airport, the new terminal was designed by Aéroports de Paris Engineering. Preliminary work and site preparation had started as of May 2008, but it remains unclear when the terminal will be open for operation. The contract for Benina International Airport included construction of a new international terminal, runway, and apron. The new airport would have been part of an extensive new infrastructure programme being undertaken by the government of Libya throughout the country.

==== Civil War ====
In March 2011, forces loyal to Muammar Gaddafi bombed the airport. No damages were reported to facilities.

As part of humanitarian efforts by the Italian government, flights of military C130's flew into Benina to offer aid and medical support in the 2011 and 2017.

Fighting in the nearby city of Benghazi during the civil war spread to the airport during 2014.

== Post-Civil War ==
The airport was closed on 16 May 2014, due to clashes in the area between Islamist armed groups and forces loyal to General Khalifa Haftar. By August 2014, international airlines had suspended all flights to Libya. The airport was subsequently closed to passenger traffic.

On 15 July 2017, the airport was reopened for commercial flights after three-years of closure due to fighting in Benghazi. Reuters reported that the first flights (operated by Libyan Airlines and Afriqiyah Airways) were to within the country to Tripoli and Kufra, and to Amman in Jordan. Additionally scheduled flights were planned to the Libyan city of Zintan, and to Tunis (Tunisia), Istanbul (Turkey) and Alexandria (Egypt).

Flights were again suspended for 18 months, resuming in October 2020.

In 2022, the airport's new passenger terminal was inaugurated and named after Berniq Airways.

In 2025, multiple countries had evaluated the possibility of resuming additional commercial flights, including direct flights from Rome and from Saudi Arabia.

The European Aviation Safety Agency (EASA) has recommended that Libya is a no-fly zone with limited exceptions.

== Military use ==
According to reporting in Le Monde, French special forces have operated out of Benina airport.

== Airlines and destinations ==
Airlines	Destinations
Afriqiyah Airways	Alexandria, Cairo, Kufra, Misrata, Sabha, Tripoli–Mitiga, Tunis
Air Mediterranean	Athens
Belavia	Seasonal charter: Minsk
Berniq Airways	Dubai–Al Maktoum, Istanbul, Misrata, Tripoli–Mitiga, Tunis, Zintan
Buraq Air	Tripoli–Mitiga
Egyptair	Alexandria, Cairo
Flydubai	Dubai–International
Fly Oya	Zintan
Libyan Airlines	Alexandria, Cairo, Istanbul, Jeddah, Kufra, Tripoli–Mitiga, Tunis
Marathon Airlines	Athens
MedSky Airways	Athens, Rome–Fiumicino, Valletta, Tripoli–Mitiga
Royal Jordanian	Amman–Queen Alia
Syrian Air	Damascus
Turkish Airlines	Istanbul

== Accidents and incidents ==
- On 9 August 1958, Central African Airways Flight 890, a Vickers Viscount registration VP-YNE, crashed 9 kilometres (5.6 mi) south east of Benina, killing 36 of the 54 people on board.
- On 21 February 1973, Libyan Arab Airlines Flight 114, a Boeing 727-200, left Tripoli and flew to Benina, for its scheduled stopover. After taking off from Benina for its ultimate destination Cairo, it became lost because of a combination of bad weather and equipment failure over Northern Egypt. Unknowingly, its pilot, a French citizen, entered Israeli controlled airspace over the Sinai Peninsula, where it was intercepted by two Israeli F-4 Phantom IIs; once the pilot had reversed course and the plane was already on its way out of the Sinai, it was shot down by the Israeli fighter pilots after they did not receive a response to their demands for the aircraft to land. Of the 113 people on board, there were five survivors, including the co-pilot, as 108 civilians were killed in the incident.
- On 20 July 1973, Japan Air Lines Flight 404, a Boeing 747-246B was a passenger flight which was hijacked by Palestinian and Japanese terrorists. After several Middle Eastern governments refused to permit Flight 404 to land, the plane eventually touched down in Dubai, in the United Arab Emirates. After several days on the ground, the terrorists demanded the release of Kozo Okamoto, survivor of the JRA's attack on Tel Aviv's Lod Airport. After the Israeli government refused to release Okamoto, the hijackers flew the aircraft first to Damascus, Syria, and then to Benghazi, in Libya. On 23 July, 89 hours after the hijacking began, the passengers and crew were released; the hijackers then blew up the aircraft, making the incident the second hull loss of a Boeing 747.
- On 2 December 1977, a Tupolev Tu-154 (registration LZ-BTN) passenger jet ran out of fuel and crashed near Benghazi, Libya. A total of 59 passengers were killed. The aircraft took off from King Abdulaziz International Airport in Saudi Arabia on a flight to Benina International Airport. With a crew of 6 and 159 passengers – pilgrims returning to Libya from the Hajj – on board. Egyptian airspace was closed to Libyan aircraft at the time, necessitating an indirect route to Benghazi instead of the direct route across Egypt; the crew reportedly did not plan for the longer flight time, leaving the aircraft short of fuel. As the aircraft neared Benghazi heavy fog blanketed the airport and the crew could not land the aircraft. After failing to locate the alternate airport the aircraft ran out of fuel and crashed during the crew's subsequent attempt to make an emergency landing, killing 59 passengers.

== See also ==
- Transport in Libya
- List of airports in Libya
