= Mitiga International Airport =

International airport serving Tripoli, Libya

Mitiga International Airport مطار معيتيقة الدولي
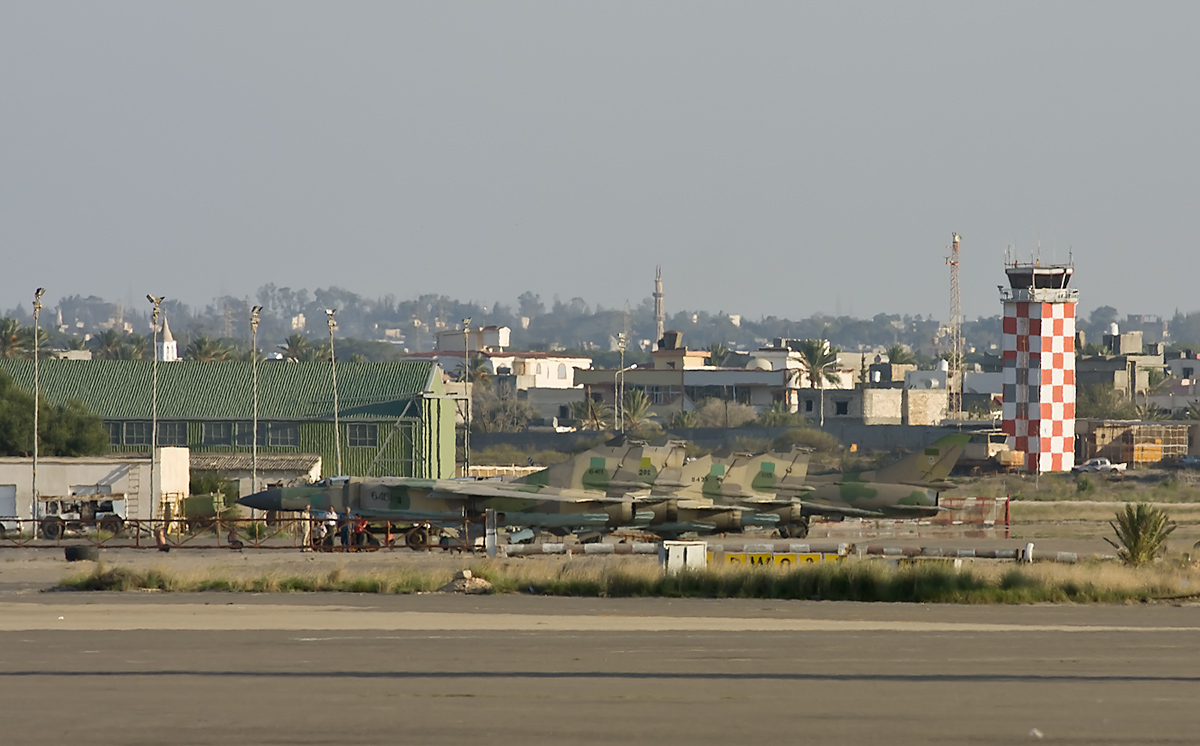
- IATA: MJI; ICAO: HLLM

Summary
- Airport type: Joint (public and military)
- Location: Tripoli, Libya
- Hub for: Afriqiyah Airways
- Built: 1995 (established as public airport)
- Elevation AMSL: 36 ft (11 m)
- Coordinates: 32°54′N 13°17′E
- Website: https://www.mitiga-airport.ly

Map
- Location within Libya

Runways
Direction	Length		Surface
Direction	m	ft	Surface
03/21	1,829	6,000	Asphalt
11/29	3,376	11,076	Asphalt

Mitiga International Airport (IATA: MJI, ICAO: HLLM) (مطار معيتيقة الدولي) is an international airport that serves Tripoli, Libya, located about 8 kilometres (5 miles) east of Tripoli's city centre. Since 2018 it has been the sole international airport serving Tripoli following the closure of Tripoli International Airport after it was severely damaged in the second Libyan civil war.

The airport has a diverse international history and has been known by a variety of names. It was originally built in 1923 as a Royal Italian Air Force base called aeroporto militare di Mellaha. It became a German air base during World War II. The airbase was captured by the British 8th Army in January 1943 and transferred to the control of the US Army Air Forces, who called it Mellaha AAF until 1945, when they renamed it Wheelus Air Base for a US airman killed that year. American use continued until the 1969 Libyan coup d'état and the subsequent expiration of the lease. When the Americans left, the base was renamed Okba Ben Nafi Air Base (قاعدة عقبة بن نافع الجوية) after the Islamic general who conquered North Africa. It was used by both the Libyan and Soviet air forces. The United States bombed the base in 1986 during Operation El Dorado Canyon. In 1995, the air base was converted to a second civilian airport for Tripoli, and was given its current name.

== History ==
The airport was originally built in 1923 by the Italian Air Force as Mellaha Air Base (الملاّحة). A motor racing circuit was subsequently built around the airport and Mellaha Lake began hosting the popular Tripoli Grand Prix in 1933.

Mellaha was used by the German Luftwaffe during the North African Campaign, with the Germans using it for short range recon units, as well as coastal and naval recon units. Special weather recon units also existed at Mehalla. The main Luftwaffe unit stationed at the base was the 2nd Staffel of the Aufklärungsgruppe (H) 14 or 2.(H)/14. The squadron was equipped with twelve single-engine Henschel Hs 126, an aircraft with a 2-man crew, which could cover approx 710 km, with a maximum speed of 360 km/h, as well as three Fieseler Fi 156 Storch liaison aircraft, and a Junkers Ju 52 for transport of men and materiel.

The airbase was captured by the British 8th Army in January 1943. The US Army Air Force began using Mellaha as a base in January 1943. It was used by the 376th Bombardment Group (Heavy) of the 12th Air Force for Consolidated B-24 Liberator bomb missions into Italy and southern parts of Germany. In addition, Mellaha Field was used by Air Transport Command. It functioned as a stopover en route to Benina Airport near Benghazi or to Tunis Airport, Tunisia on the North African Cairo-Dakar transport route for cargo, transiting aircraft and personnel.

On 15 April 1945, Mellaha AAF was taken over by USAAF's Air Training Command. It was renamed Wheelus Army Air Field (AAF) on 17 May 1945 in honor of USAAF Lieutenant Richard Wheelus who had died earlier that year in a plane crash in Iran. During the USAFs tenure, the base was extended, demolishing the derelict motor-racing buildings. A 1954 agreement with Libya extended use of the base until 1971, but changing needs led the United States to withdraw completely by 1970, handing the facility over to the new Libyan government that had taken power a year earlier in the 1969 Libyan coup d'état.

=== Libyan/Soviet use ===
After the US Air Force left in 1970, the base was renamed Okba Ben Nafi Air Base (seemingly after the legendary hero Uqba ibn Nafi) and served as a Libyan People's Air Force (LPAF) installation. The base housed the LPAF's headquarters and a large share of its major training facilities. In addition, aircraft and personnel of the Soviet Air Force took up residence at the base.

LPAF Soviet-made MiG-17/19/25 fighters and Tu-22 bombers were based at Okba Ben Nafi Air Base. Of the combat aircraft, the US State Department estimated in 1983 that fifty percent remained in storage, including most of the MiG fighters and Tu-22 bombers.

=== U.S. bombing raid in 1986 ===
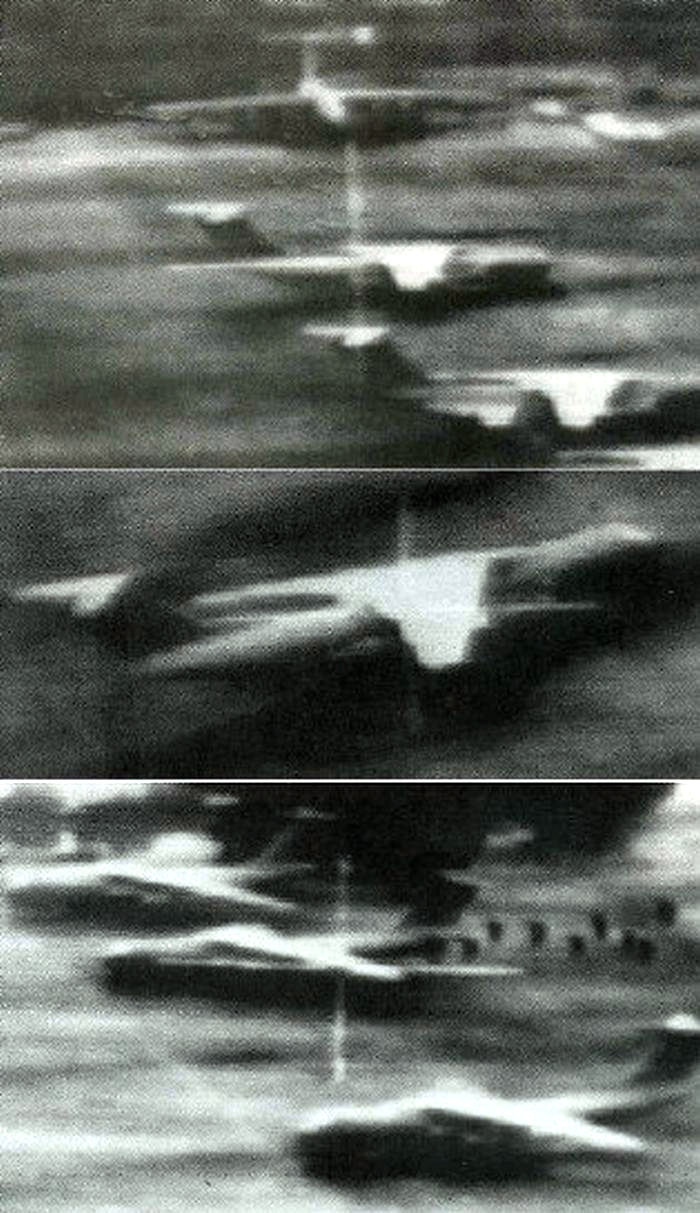
Ilyushin Il-76 targeted in the bombing of 1986

The base was a primary target of the 1986 United States bombing of Libya (Operation "El Dorado Canyon"), launched against Libya due to missile attacks on US aircraft and Libyan involvement in terrorist attacks against US servicemen in Europe. At 2 a.m. on 16 April 1986, Okba Ben Nafi AB, various Libyan government buildings, and three alleged Libyan terrorist training camps were bombed by General Dynamics F-111 Aardvarks from the 48th Tactical Fighter Wing, flying from the United Kingdom, to Libya.

The raid included eighteen F-111 fighter-bombers, five General Dynamics–Grumman EF-111A Raven from the 66th Electronic Combat Wing/42nd Electronic Combat Squadron, and carrier-based Navy F-14 Tomcats and A-6E Intruders. The EF-111s formed up with the attack force to provide electronic defense during the attack. One 48 TFW F-111F was lost presumably to a surface-to-air missile or AAA hit. The 48 TFW that bombed the base had practiced for years with F-100s at this very same air base when it was Wheelus Air Base and later at Zaragoza AB Spain with F-4D Phantoms and F-111s for similar missions.

=== Post–Cold War ===
Okba Ben Nafi AB was converted for civilian use and became Mitiga Airport in 1995. The airport also housed the headquarters of Buraq Air.

=== 2011 Libyan civil war ===
During the 2011 Libyan civil war, the Times of Malta and The Guardian reported claims that the airport had been taken over by protesters opposed to Libyan leader Muammar Gaddafi. On 13 March 2011, Ali Atiyya, a colonel of the Libyan Air Force at the airport, defected and joined the anti-Gaddafi forces. On 21 August 2011, rebels launched an assault on Mitiga as part of a bid to battle loyalist forces in Tripoli, sustaining a number of casualties in the process. On 25 October 2011 Google Earth released multispectral imagery from GeoEye taken on 28 August 2011 which showed the airfield as well as the highly capable MiG-25 aircraft with no visible damage. This imagery helped corroborate reporting which suggested that the airfield had been taken over early on by opposition protesters; moreover, NATO and US air forces would have wanted to avoid collateral damage to the opposition movement.

=== 2014 Libyan civil war ===
During the 2019–20 Western Libya campaign, the airport, held by military units loyal to the Government of National Accord, was repeatedly targeted with airstrikes from the opposing Libyan National Army in order to enforce a no-fly zone declared by the LNA several days prior. On 8 April 2019, an airport spokesman announced that the airport was forced to close due to airstrikes.

TunisAir was the first foreign carrier to resume flights to the airport, in May 2021.

== Airlines and destinations ==
=== Passenger ===
Airlines	Destinations
Aeroitalia	Bergamo, Rome–Fiumicino
Afriqiyah Airways	Alexandria, Amman, Benghazi, Cairo, Istanbul, Kufra, Port Sudan, Sfax, Tunis; Hajj & Umrah: Jeddah
Air Algérie	Algiers
Air Cairo	Cairo
Air Libya	Benghazi
Berniq Airways	Benghazi, Cairo, Istanbul; Hajj & Umrah: Jeddah, Medina
Buraq Air	Benghazi, Tunis
Crown Airlines	Alexandria, Benghazi, Cairo, Istanbul
Egyptair	Cairo
Fly Cham	Damascus
Fly Oya	Alexandria, Beida, Benghazi, Cairo, Dubai–International, Ghat, Istanbul, Niamey, Sabha; Hajj & Umrah: Jeddah, Medina
Ghadames Air Transport	Istanbul, Tunis
Global Air	Beida, Benghazi, Ghat, Ubari
ITA Airways	Rome–Fiumicino (resumes 17 January 2027)
Libyan Airlines	Alexandria, Benghazi, Cairo, Istanbul, Niamey, Tunis; Hajj & Umrah: Jeddah, Medina, Ghadames East
Libyan Wings	Amman–Queen Alia, Benghazi, Istanbul, Sabha, Tunis
MedSky Airways	Antalya, Athens, Benghazi, Düsseldorf, Istanbul, Malta, Madrid, Milan–Malpensa, Paris–Charles de Gaulle, Rome–Fiumicino, Sabha
Pegasus Airlines	Istanbul–Sabiha Gökçen
Royal Air Maroc	Casablanca
Royal Jordanian	Amman–Queen Alia
Tunisair	Tunis
Turkish Airlines	Istanbul

=== Cargo ===
Airlines	Destinations
Egyptair Cargo	Cairo, Ostend
MNG Airlines	Istanbul
Turkish Cargo	Istanbul
ULS Airlines Cargo	Istanbul

== Accidents and incidents ==
- On 23 December 2016, Afriqiyah Airways Flight 209 from Sabha Airport to Mitiga International Airport, operated by an Airbus A320-214, registration 5A-ONB was hijacked and diverted to Malta International Airport.

== See also ==
- Transport in Libya
- List of airports in Libya
- List of airlines of Libya
