= Misrata Airport =

Misrata international Airport

Misrata International Airport مطار مصراتة الدولي
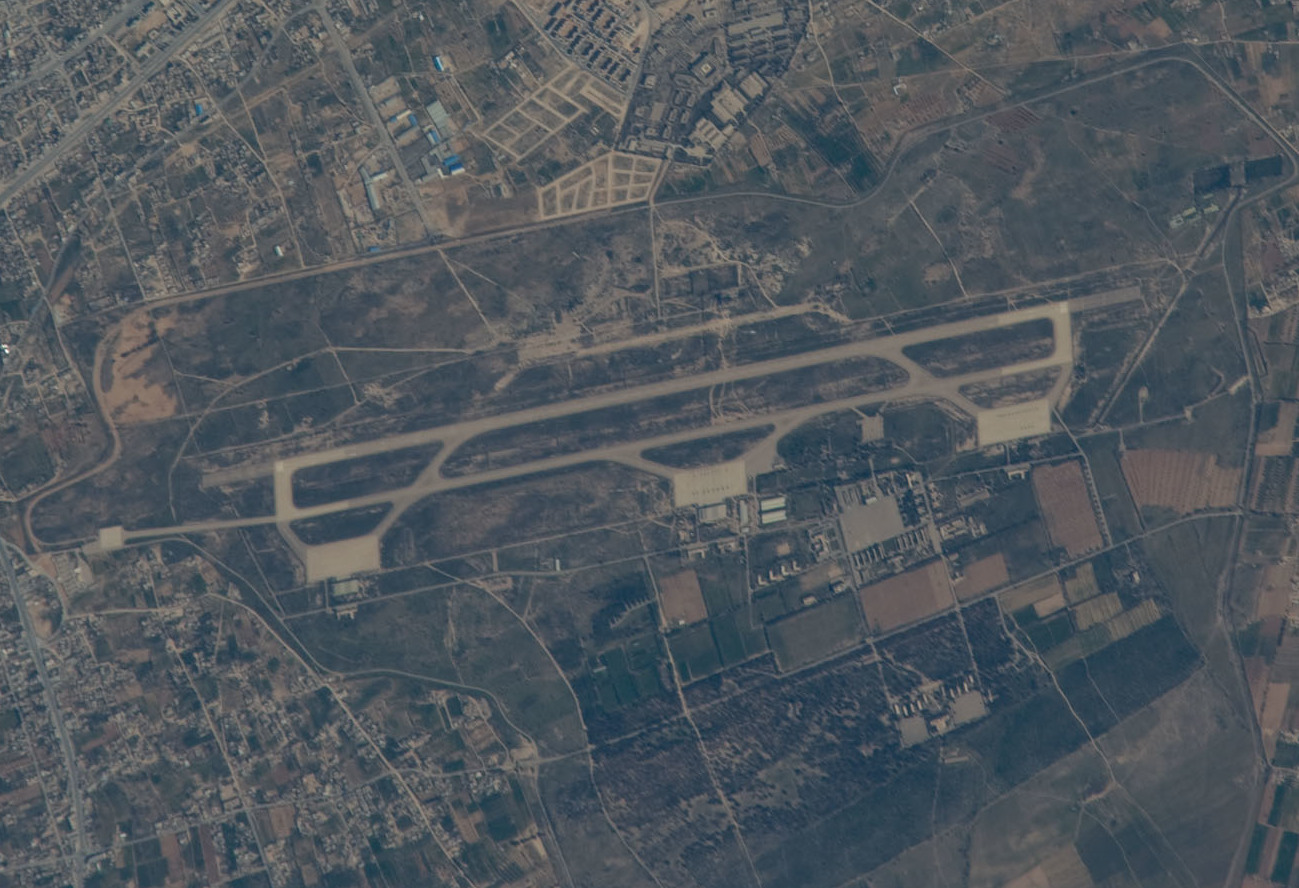
- IATA: MRA; ICAO: HLMS

Summary
- Airport type: Public/Military
- Operator: Libyan Airports Authority
- Location: Misrata, Libya
- Opened: 1998
- Elevation AMSL: 60 ft (18 m)
- Coordinates: 32°19′32″N 15°3′35″E
- Website: www.misurataairport.ly

Map
- Location within Libya

Runways
Direction	Length		Surface
Direction	m	ft	Surface
15/33	3,400	11,155	Asphalt
- Source: GCM SkyVector

Misrata International Airport (IATA: MRA, ICAO: HLMS) is an international airport serving Misrata, a Mediterranean coastal city in the Misrata District of Libya. It also acts as an air base and training center for the Libyan Air Force.

== History ==
The airport was created in 1939 as a small landing site in the Misrata province of Italian Libya.

On 15 December 2011, the airport celebrated its first regularly scheduled international commercial flights by a non-Libyan airline (Turkish Airlines).

On 14 July 2014, the airport was closed to flights due to clashes at Tripoli International Airport, which Misrata International Airport is dependent on for its operations. Flights resumed on the night of 15 July.

On 3 August 2020, a fire destroyed the airport's passenger terminal.

== Military use ==
The Libyan Air Force operates the Soko G-2 aircraft extensively at Misrata in both a training and counterinsurgency capacity.

The first Libyan warplane to challenge the no-fly zone during the Libyan Civil War was a G-2 taking off from Misrata on March 24, 2011. It was reported to have been promptly shot down by the French Air Force. A few hours later an armed forces spokesman specified that the plane was destroyed on the runway with an AASM air-to-ground missile just after it had landed.

== Airlines and destinations ==
=== Passengers ===
Airlines	Destinations
Afriqiyah Airways	Benghazi, Cairo, Istanbul, Sfax, Tunis; Hajj & Umrah: Jeddah
Berniq Airways	Alexandria, Benghazi, Cairo, Istanbul, Tunis
Egyptair	Cairo
Fly Oya	Hajj & Umrah: Jeddah
Global Air	Benghazi
Libyan Airlines	Sfax, Tunis
Medavia	Malta
MedSky Airways	Istanbul, Malta; Hajj & Umrah: Jeddah
Royal Jordanian	Amman–Queen Alia
Turkish Airlines	Istanbul

=== Cargo ===
Airlines	Destinations
Egyptair Cargo	Cairo, Frankfurt
MNG Airlines	Istanbul

== See also ==
- Transport in Libya
- List of airports in Libya
