= Tripoli International Airport =

Former airport in Libya

Tripoli International Airport مطار طرابلس الدولي
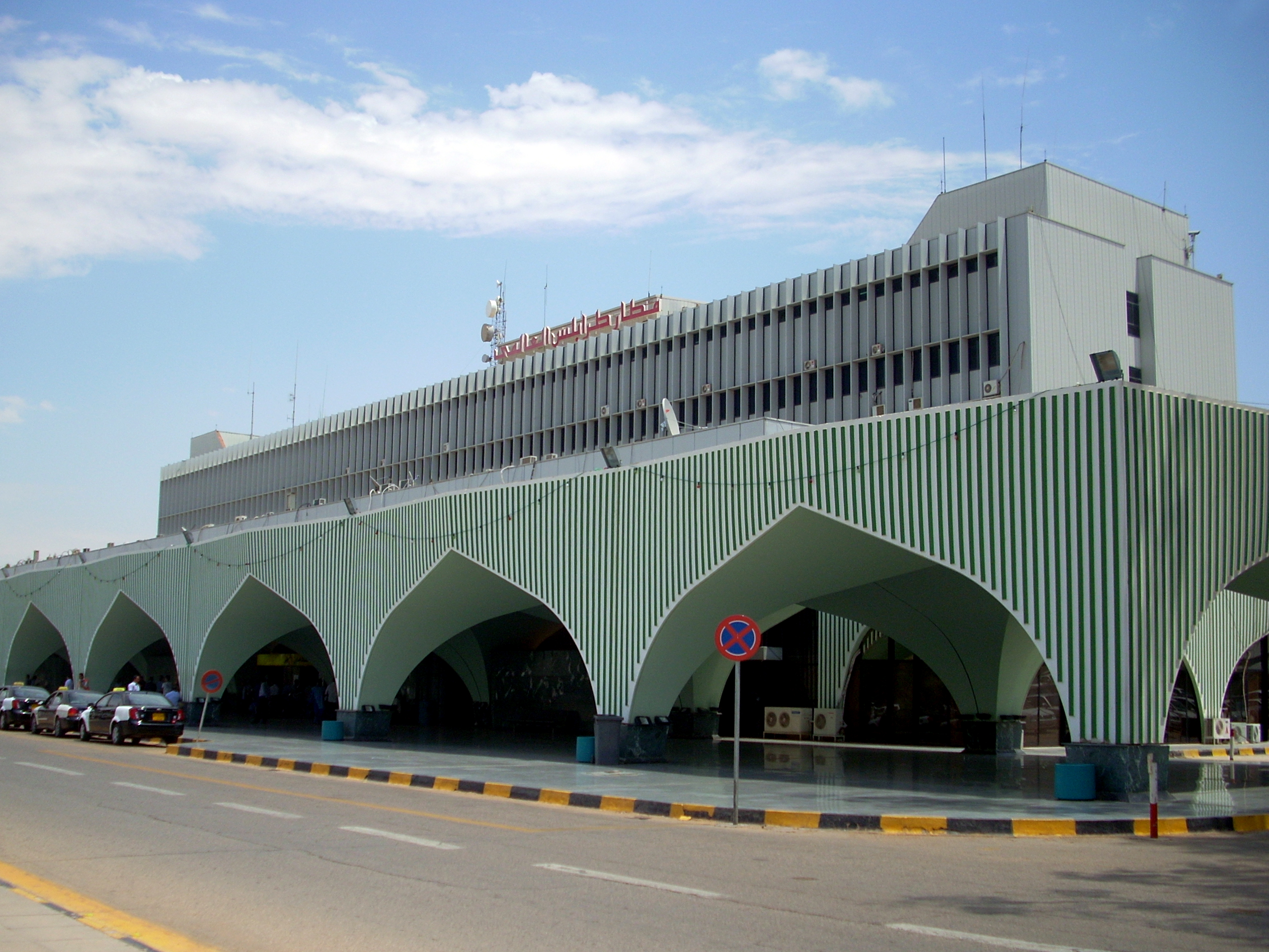
- IATA: TIP; ICAO: HLLT

Summary
- Airport type: Public
- Operator: Civil Aviation and Meteorology Bureau
- Serves: Tripoli, Libya
- Location: Qasr bin Ghashir
- Opened: 1934
- Closed: July 2014
- Passenger services ceased: July 2014
- Hub for: Afriqiyah Airways; Buraq Air; Libyan Airlines
- Elevation AMSL: 263 ft (80 m)
- Coordinates: 32°39′49″N 13°09′33″E

Map
- Location within Libya

Runways
Direction	Length		Surface
Direction	m	ft	Surface
09/27	3,600	11,811	Asphalt/Concrete
18/36	2,524	8,281	Asphalt

Statistics (2008)
- Passengers: 3,070,200
- Source: GCM SkyVector

Tripoli International Airport (IATA: TIP, ICAO: HLLT) (Arabic: مطار طرابلس الدولي) is a closed international airport built to serve Tripoli, the capital city of Libya. The airport is located in the area of Qasr bin Ghashir, 24 kilometres (15 mi) from central Tripoli. It used to be the hub for Libyan Airlines, Afriqiyah Airways, and Buraq Air.

The airport has been closed intermittently since 2011 and as of early 2018, flights to and from Tripoli have been using Mitiga International Airport instead.

During the 2014 Libyan Civil War, the airport was heavily damaged in the Battle of Tripoli Airport. The airport reopened for limited commercial use in July 2017. In April 2019, however, it was reported that Mitiga had become the last functioning airport in Tripoli during the 2019–20 Western Libya campaign. It was soon acknowledged that the ruling Government of National Accord (GNA) had bombed the airport in an attempt to recapture it from the Libyan National Army (LNA). Mitiga was soon shut down as well after being bombed by the LNA, thus making Misrata Airport, located approximately 200 km (125 miles) to the east down the coast, the nearest functional airport for Tripoli residents.

== History ==
=== As Castel Benito Airport ===
The airport was originally called Tripoli-Castel Benito Airport and was a Regia Aeronautica (Italian Air Force) airfield built in 1934 on the southern outskirts of Italian Tripoli.

In 1938 the governor of Italian Libya, Italo Balbo, enlarged the military airfield to create an international airport for civilians served by Ala Littoria, the official Italian airline: the Aeroporto di Tripoli-Castel Benito. The first international flights were to Rome, Tunis, and Malta. In 1939, a flight from Rome to Ethiopia and Somalia was one of the first intercontinental flights.

=== Post-war ===
In the early hours of 23 January 1943, the Eighth Army entered Tripoli and captured Castel Benito Airport. By then, it had been destroyed from Allied aerial raids. Three days later, a Lockheed 14 G-AFKE Lothair of BOAC landed at the airport, marking the first 'post-war' landing of a civil aircraft. That year, the Royal Engineers constructed three 4,950 foot (1,509 metres) long runways, running north to south (18/36), southeast to northeast (05/23), and west-northwest to east-southeast (11/29). They were built using four inches of bitume-grouted crushed stone on six to eight inches of sand and crushed stone. In 1945, major upgrades were completed to solve surface disintegration and unevenness. Under the upgrade, the runways were resurfaced, 18/36 was lengthened to 7,316 ft (2,230 metres) long, and 05/23 was abandoned. In 1951, following the creation of the Libyan state, the airport's name was changed from Castel Benito to Idris el Awal (Idris 1st).

Runway 18/36 was resurfaced again in 1965, however its surface condition was already poor by the following year. Runway 11/29 was also reported to be in bad condition, as it accumulated water following rain, and some taxiways were abandoned due to their state. In the early 1960s, plans were conceived for the development of a triangular shaped terminal, although it was never built and hangar continued to serve as the terminal. Plagued with continuous issues and stalled plans, the Government launched plans to modernise the airport. In 1966, construction of a new east to west runway (09/27) commenced, though delayed by the 1969 Libyan Revolution. The revolution resulted in the airport being renamed to its present name, Tripoli. The new runway was eventually completed, measuring 11,811 ft (3,600 metres) long, and 18/36 was retained as part of the taxiway system. In September 1972, preliminary designing of a new terminal began, and a master plan was developed by Sir Alexander Gibb & Partners. It was completed by 1977 and was officially opened on 28 July 1978.

In 1983, Greek engineering consultancy JEPA S.A. developed a design plan for Gibb Petermuller & Partners. It provided an electromechanical design and a built area of 12,000 m^{2}. Engineer John George Andrews directed the designs for the terminal buildings at the airport, while working under Gibb Petermuller & Partners.

An oblique photograph of the newly opened terminal at the airport, 1978.

The airport closed from March 2011 to October 2011 as a result of the United Nations Security Council establishing a no-fly zone over Libya. The Zintan Brigade captured the airport during their advance on Tripoli on 21 August 2011. The airport was officially reopened on 11 October 2011.

On 14 July 2014, the airport was the site of fierce battle as militias from the city of Misrata attempted to take control of the airport. The airport has been closed to flights since the clashes. On 23 August 2014, after 40 days of clashes, Zintan forces, which controlled the airport, withdrew. The Los Angeles Times reported that at least 90% of the airport's facilities and 20 airplanes were destroyed in the fighting.

While still under the control of Misrata militias, the VIP terminal, which had not been not as badly damaged, was reopened on 16 February 2017. A new passenger terminal is in planning by the political body representing the militias.

In April 2019, the airport was captured by forces loyal to the Libyan National Army (LNA) and its leader Khalifa Haftar and was held for over a year, despite the control of the airport passing back to the GNA briefly in May 2019. Due to its location at the southern border of the Tripoli Metropolitan Area, it served as a part of the larger suburban stronghold of Qasr bin Ghashir village south of Tripoli City, used as a staging ground in attacks attempting to capture or weaken GNA's hold of the capital. As a result of ongoing clashes, it was acknowledged that the open terrain was subject to retaliatory and preliminary bombing by the GNA from Tripoli frontier, making it unusable as an airport.

The airport, along with the village of Qasr bin Ghashir, was retaken in June 2020 by the GNA as part of its 2020 offensive to push back the LNA and end the siege of the capital city. The taking of the airport signified that the GNA had regained control of the entire city and metropolitan area of Tripoli.

=== Reconstruction efforts ===
In June 2020, the Tripoli-based government formally recommitted itself to completing airport projects, including the passenger terminal project at Tripoli International Airport. In July, the Airports Authority, Transportation Projects Execution Authority, Civil Aviation Authority and National Meteorological Center established a working group to manage and prioritise rehabilitation projects. This involved dividing them into implementation stages and prepare the required construction and maintenance work using assessment. It was based off field inspections of the airport conditions and damage extent. In September 2020, the site was inspected, and it was assessed that projects involving facilities that suffered more than 90% damage were to be prepared under a new development programme. In May 2021, the Airports Authority announced that surveying and the clearing of unexplored ordnance would precede reconstruction. Military engineers were tasked with the clearing after which the Transport Ministry could authorise contractors to return to the site. In August 2021, the Ministry of Transport discussed a proposal from the Al-Bairaq Company for supplementary works to the passenger terminal project. By November, arrangements were discussed for Turkish companies to return and resume work on the airport.

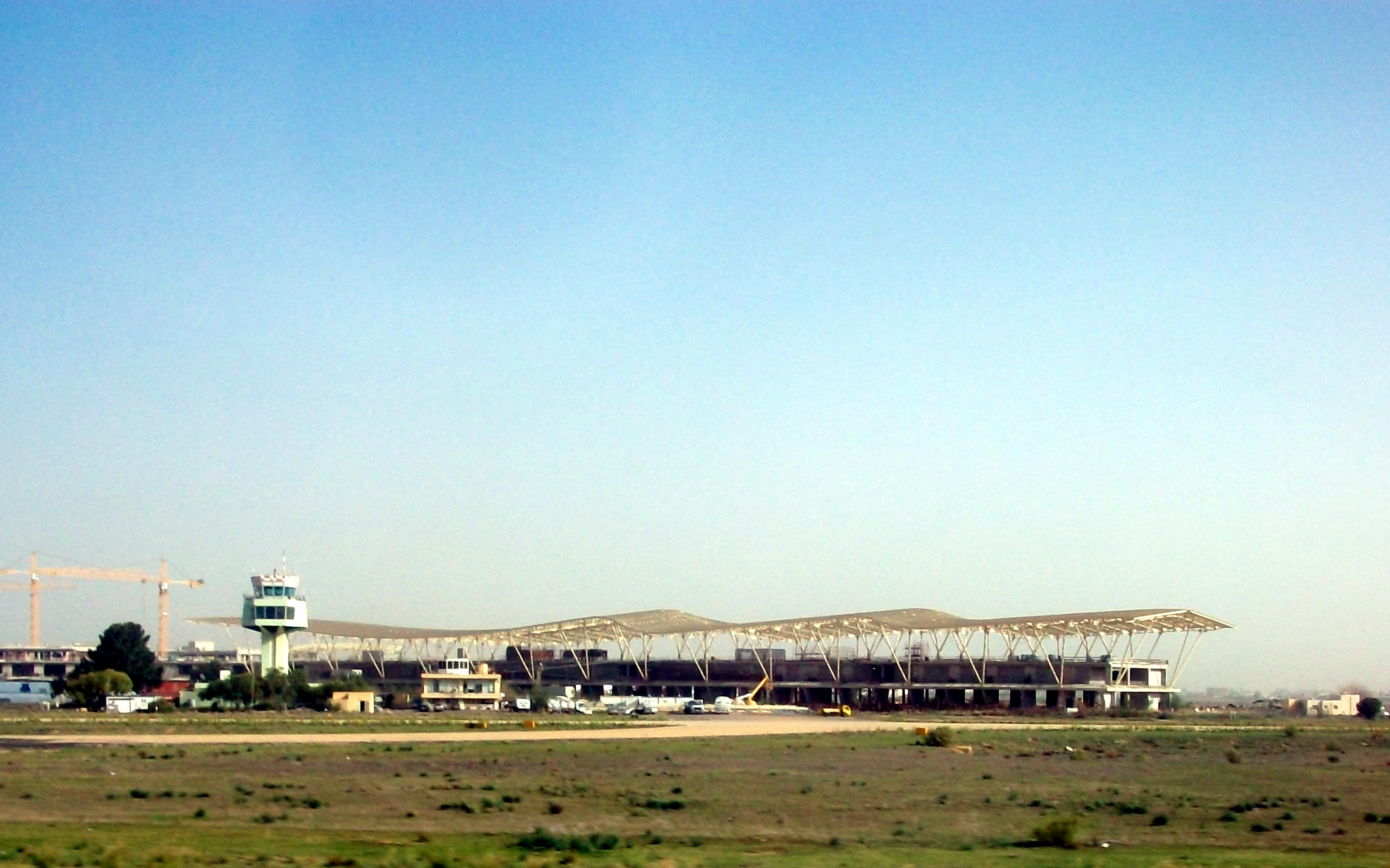
Progress on the construction of the first of two new terminals at Tripoli International Airport in Libya as of March 2013. Construction has stopped as of the Libyan revolution in February 2011.

In April 2022, Transport Minister Mohamed al-Shahoubi met with Italian representatives for restarting the terminal contract, with both parties agreeing to begin the handover of the site. The project, stalled since 2011, involved two terminals for domestic and international and associated facilities, having a reported value of approximately €80 million. In October 2022, the Interior Ministry held a meeting concerning security for reconstruction works carried out by the Italian Aeneas consortium. In February 2023, the Italian Aeneas consortium began construction at Tripoli International Airport under a contract valued €78 million, covering two passenger terminals. The projected construction period was approximately 10-15 months. The planned terminal complex was to encompass 30,000m^{2} in total with an initial annual capacity of 6 to 6.5 million passengers. In May, the Italian ambassador inspected the construction site and described the progress as encouraging.

In June 2024, al-Shahoubi met with Italian ambassador and Aeneas representatives to review problems and difficulties affecting the implementation, delaying progress. The minister expressed concern about delays and instructed the consortium to accelerate the work. In September, another inspection found that additional infrastructure was still required. In August, the contract with Aeneas consortium was revoked for the construction of the terminal due to their delay in delivering the construction amidst funding issues. On 18 September, Transport Ministry undersecretary Wissam al-Idrissi announced that the contract was cancelled, citing their alleged failure to comply with its obligations. On 14 October, president of Aeneas, Elio Franci remarked that the project had been blocked and experienced irregularities in payments, withheld amounts and the absence of expected financing. In November 2024, construction work on the metal framing for terminals T1 and T2 were reported as being 73.53% advanced. The total value for the metal structure was €894,359.86 alone. In July 2025, the Airports Authority contracted the OZMEN Group to complete the passenger terminal. In June 2026, the Libyan Customs Authority began preparing personnel, equipment, logistics and procedures required to operate the customs facility at the airport once it entered service.

=== Preparation and opening ===
On 25 May 2026, the Airports Authority held the first meeting of a joint committee established under Transport Ministry Decision No. 353 of 2026. The meeting was to test the readiness of the airport's systems and equipment for operation and to supervise the transition to the new airport. The committee includes representatives from the Airports Authority, Civil Aviation Authority, National Meteorological Centre, Libyan Ground Services Company, Transport Projects Implementation Agency, and Libyan Internal Investment and Development Fund. On 23 September, Transport Minister Mohamed al-Shahoubi inaugurated a new Air Traffic Management Centre adjacent to the airport. Live communications with aircraft in the Libyan airspace were tested, including traffic around Kufra and the Egyptian border. On 25 September 2026, the Ministry of Transport held a meeting involving the Libyan Internal Investment and Development Fund and airlines operating in Libya to discuss the technical and operational requirements for the airport's reopening. Tripoli International Airport is scheduled to open during the four quarter of 2026.

On 23 October, ICAO formally lifted airspace restrictions at Tripoli International Airport, which had been in place since 2015.

== Facilities ==
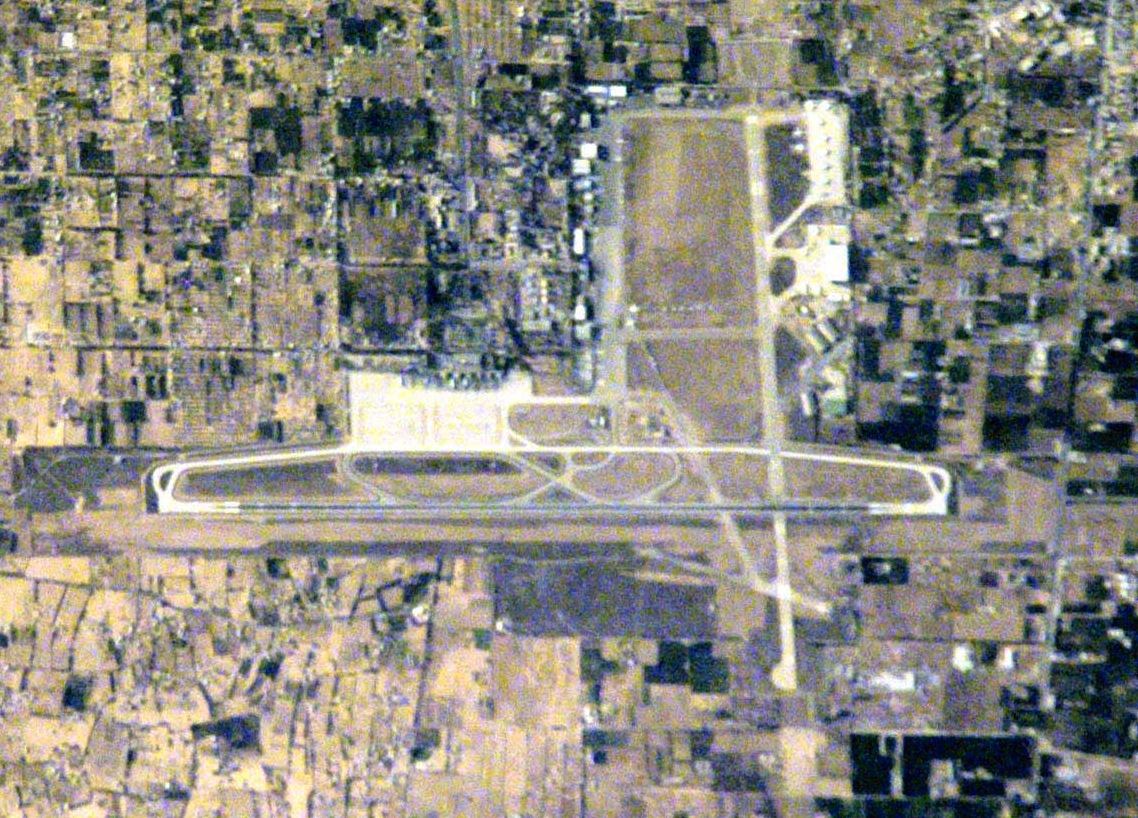
The airport's existing terminals and runways in a satellite image

=== Terminals ===
Prior to its destruction, Tripoli International Airport had one main passenger terminal that served international and domestic departures and arrivals. The terminal hall was a five-story building with an area of 33,000 square metres (360,000 sq ft), and was capable of handling three million passengers annually. Check-in facilities were all located on the ground floor. The departure gates were located on the floor above as was the duty-free section. Beside this was a prayer room and a first-class lounge which served business class and above on almost all airlines operating from the airport. According to satellite imagery dated July 2017, the entire passenger terminal is completely demolished, however the jet ways can still be seen sitting in the position relative to their formal gates.

The airport operated 24 hours a day. There was no overnight accommodation at the airport but there were plans to build an airport hotel to serve transit flyers. A restaurant was on the fourth floor of the international terminal. The head office of the Libyan Civil Aviation Authority was on the airport property.

=== Expansion plans ===
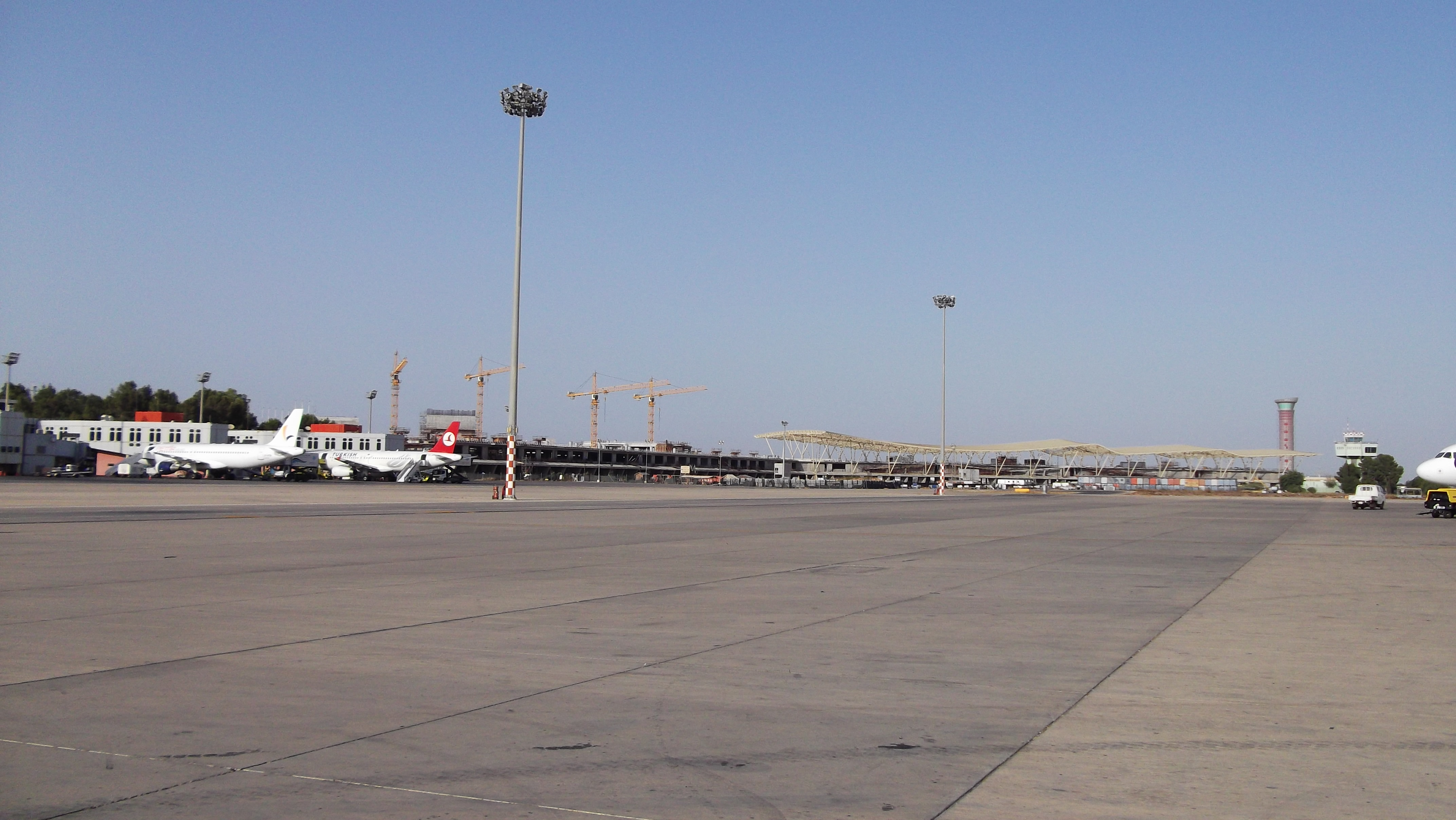
Apron with the halted construction of the planned new terminals visible

In September 2007, the Libyan government announced a project to upgrade and expand the airport. The eventual total cost of the project, contracted to a joint venture between Brazil's Odebrecht, TAV Construction of Turkey, Consolidated Contractors Company of Greece and Vinci Construction of France, was LD2.54 billion ($2.1 billion). The project was to construct two new terminals at the airport (an East Terminal and a West Terminal) on either side of the existing International Terminal. Each of the new terminals would have been 162,000 square metres (1,740,000 sq ft) in size, and collectively they would have had a capacity of 20 million passengers and a parking lot for 4,400 vehicles. French company Aéroports de Paris designed the terminals, which were expected to serve 100 aircraft simultaneously. Work started in October 2007 on the first new terminal. The initial capacity will be 6 million passengers when the first module comes into operation.

Preparation was also underway for the second new terminal, which would eventually have brought the total capacity to 20 million passengers; the completed airport is expected to strengthen Libya's position as an African aviation hub. Although the government identified Tripoli airport as a "fast track" project in 2007, leading to construction work starting before the design was fully developed, the project was not finished until at least May 2011. The cost of the project had also been rising, leading to an intense round of renegotiations. The project has since been halted due to the ongoing civil war that led to further damages to the airport.

In February 2019 the Libyan Ministry of Transportation announced that work at the airport had been resumed. In May 2021 the foreign minister of Italy, Luigi Di Maio, announced that Italian companies would begin construction work at the airport in a few months. It was expected to be completed in 2024, however due to Libya failing to keep up with payments the Italian firms delayed construction in October 2024 before the project was transferred to a Libyan contractor. The first asphalt layer of the runway was reportedly laid in September 2025.

== Airlines and destinations ==
As of July 2014, all passenger flights into Tripoli use Mitiga International Airport; all scheduled cargo operations into Tripoli International Airport have also ceased.

== Accidents and incidents ==
- On 9 May 1944, a Douglas Dakota III (KG548) of the RAF crashed and burned on takeoff during its delivery flight when the undercarriage retracted. It is unknown if anyone died.
- On 1 February 1949, an Avro 685 York I (G-AGJD) of BOAC swung to the right during takeoff in a crosswind, overcorrected, and crashed. All 15 occupants survived; the plane was written off.
- On 4 February 1949, a Douglas C-54A-1-DO (G-AJPL) of Skyways that was chartered by the UK War Office to transport personnel back to the UK from Nairobi crashed after the no. 3 and no. 4 engines failed on approach from Khartoum in heavy rain and low visibility, hitting trees at 700 feet. 1 crew member of the 53 occupants was killed.
- On 8 October 1949, a Douglas Dakota IV (KN435) of the RAF crashed on takeoff when engine power was lost and was damaged beyond repair. All 3 occupants survived.
- On 7 November 1949, an Avro 691 Lancastrian C.1 (G-AGMM) of BOAC crashed here and was damaged beyond repair. it is unknown if anyone died.
- On 21 September 1955, a Canadair C-4 Argonaut (G-ALHL) of BOAC on a flight from London to Kano crashed on approach here, striking trees 1200 feet short of runway 11 at 22:23 UTC in strong winds and poor visibility. 15 of the 47 occupants were killed.
- On 1 June 1970, a Tupolev Tu-104A (OK-NDD) of CSA Ceskoslovenske Aerolinie crashed on approach from Prague, hitting the ground 5.5 km south of runway 36 at 350 km/h after 2 failed visual approaches to runway 18 at 03:12 UTC and catching fire. All 13 occupants were killed.
- On 2 January 1971, a de Havilland DH-106 Comet 4C (SU-ALC) of UAA arriving from Algiers crashed on approach after hitting sand dunes at 395 feet during an ADF procedure turn for runway 18; all 16 occupants were killed.
- On 15 April 1986, an attack by 6 F-111F strategic bombers at 02:10 on the airport destroyed 3 Ilyushin Il-76 transport planes, 2 of Jamahiriya Air Transport (5A-DNF and 5A-DNL) and one owned by the Libyan Arab Republic Air Force (5A-DLL), and a de Havilland Canada DHC-6 Twin Otter 300 of the Libyan Ministry of Agriculture (5A-DCS).
- On 27 July 1989, Korean Air Flight 803 was a scheduled International passenger service from Seoul, South Korea to Tripoli, Libya with intermediate stops in Bangkok, Thailand and Jeddah, Saudi Arabia. There were a total of 199 occupants. The weather at the time of the crash consisted of heavy fog and visibility was between 100 and 800 feet (30 and 244 m). Nevertheless, in such circumstances, the flight crew decided to continue the approach. On approach to runway 27, the McDonnell Douglas DC-10-30 dropped below the glide path, then at 7:05 (according to other data - 7:30), it crashed into two buildings, broke into three sections, and burst into flames. The crash site was in an orchard 1.5 miles (2.4 km; 1.3 nmi) short of runway 27. 75 people (72 passengers and 3 crew members) died in the crash, in addition to four people on the ground.
- On 22 December 1992 Libyan Arab Airlines Flight 1103 was a Boeing 727-2L5 with 10 crew and 147 passengers on board that collided with a LARAF Mikoyan-Gurevich MiG-23UB on 22 December 1992. All 157 people on board flight 1103 were killed, while the crew of the MiG-23 ejected and survived. It is the deadliest aviation disaster to occur in Libyan history.
- On 12 May 2010, Afriqiyah Airways Flight 771 going from O. R. Tambo International Airport to Tripoli International Airport crashed on approach. The cause is controlled flight into terrain caused by spatial disorientation, pilot error and lack of crew resource management. Only 1 12-year-old Dutch boy survived. It is the second deadliest airplane crash in Libyan history. The aircraft was an Airbus A330-202, registration 5A-ONG.

== See also ==
- Transport in Libya
- List of airports in Libya
- List of the busiest airports in Africa
