= Afriqiyah Airways =

State-owned airline based in Tripoli, Libya

Afriqiyah Airways الخطوط الجوية الأفريقية

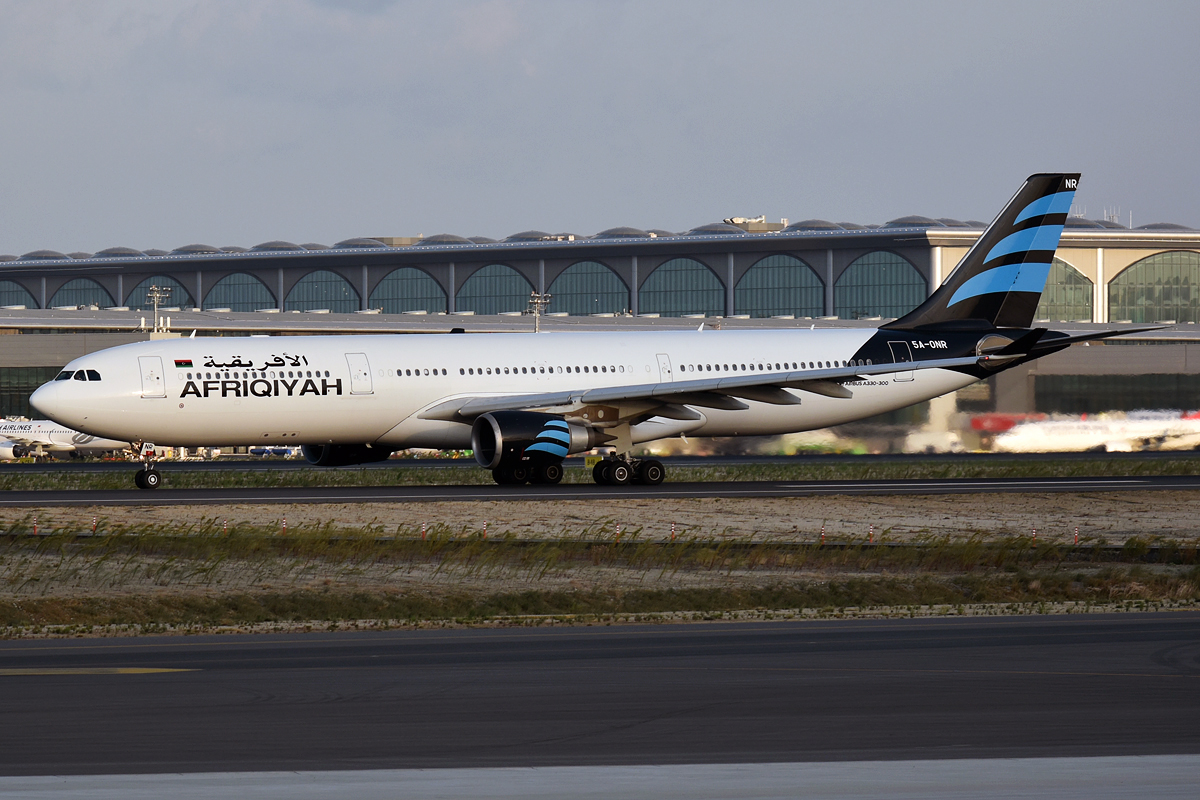
- Afriqiyah Airlines Airbus A330-302
IATA	ICAO	Call sign
8U	AAW	AFRIQIYAH
- Founded: 2001
- Hubs: Mitiga International Airport; Benina International Airport; Misrata Airport; Sebha Airport
- Frequent-flyer program: Rahal
- Fleet size: 8
- Destinations: 20
- Parent company: Libyan African Aviation Holding Co. (Government of Libya)
- Headquarters: Tripoli, Libya
- Key people: Mosbah Fadal (General Manager)
- Website: afriqiyah.aero

Afriqiyah Airways is a Libyan state-owned airline based in Tripoli, Libya. It was established in 2001 and operates both domestic and international flights. The airline's main hub is Tripoli International Airport (TIP), and it serves a wide range of destinations across Africa, the Middle East, and Europe.

Afriqiyah Airways operates a fleet primarily consisting of Airbus aircraft, including the A320, A319, and A330 models. These planes are used for both short-haul and long-haul flights.

The airline offers various services and amenities to its passengers, including in-flight entertainment, onboard dining, and a loyalty program called "Afriqiyah Club".

Over the years, Afriqiyah Airways has faced some operational challenges due to political instability in Libya. However, it has striven to maintain its operations and expand its network to serve travelers from and to Libya.

== History ==
=== Establishment and growth: 2001-2011 ===
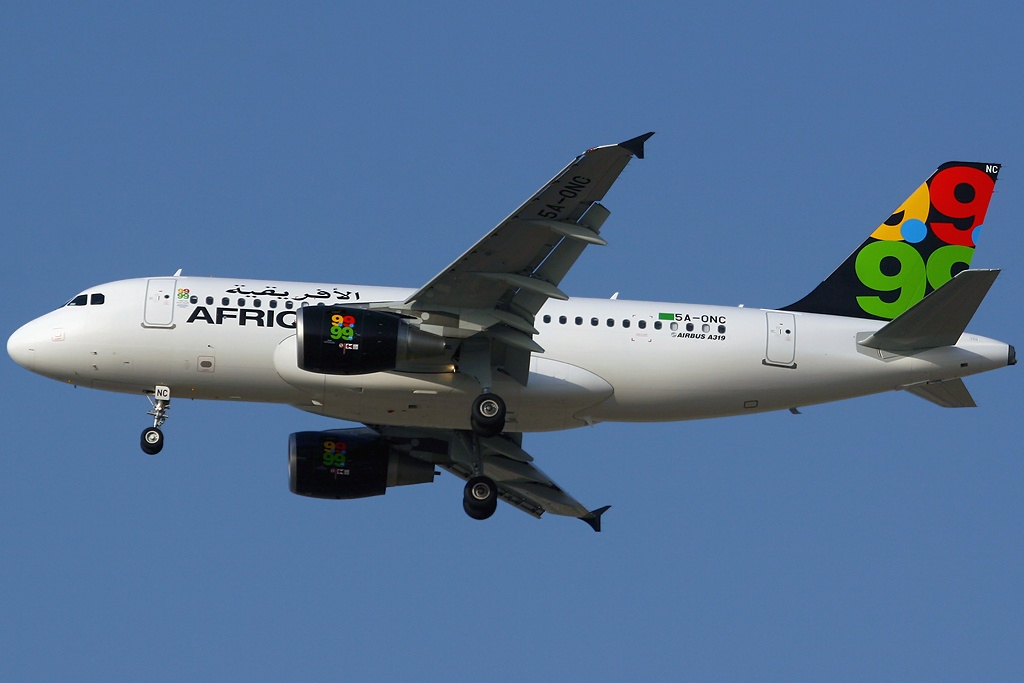
Afriqiyah Airways Airbus A319-100 bearing the airline's former livery

Afriqiyah Airways was established in April 2001 and commenced scheduled services on 1 December 2001. The name Afriqiyah comes from the Arabic word for African. It is wholly owned by the Libyan government and has 287 employees (at March 2007). The airline started with Boeing 737-400 aircraft, but in 2003, an all-Airbus fleet was introduced. The Italian airline Blue Panorama jointly set up the airline with the Libyan government. Afriqiyah Airways is one of the few airlines which does not serve alcoholic beverages on its flights.

The airline generated US$120 million in revenue in 2006.

Afriqiyah Airways signed a memorandum of understanding for the purchase of six Airbus A320s and three Airbus A319s plus an option on five, as well as for three Airbus A330-200s, with an option for three more.

The new A320s and A319s entered service on Afriqiyah's growing international network, covering routes from its base at Tripoli to seventeen destinations in North, West, and Central Africa and the Middle East, as well as to European destinations such as Paris, Brussels, London, Rome, and Amsterdam. Afriqiyah's A319s carry 124 passengers in a two-class configuration, while the A320 seats 144 in two class configurations (J16/Y128). The A330s serve the long-distance operations on routes to Southern Africa, Asia and Europe, and have a two-class configuration with 230 seats (J30/Y200). As of 2015 the airline no longer flies to some of these destinations as the airline is banned from flying in the EU.

On 20 August 2009, an Air Afriqiyah aircraft (registration 5A-IAY) – the private aircraft of Colonel Gaddafi – flew to Glasgow Airport to collect Abelbasset al-Megrahi (who had been convicted of the 1988 Lockerbie bombing and released on compassionate grounds by the Cabinet Secretary for Justice in the Scottish Government). He was flown directly from Glasgow to Tripoli.

Three A330s that were delivered in 2009 were used to inaugurate new routes to Dhaka, Johannesburg and Kinshasa. In the winter 2010, two new routes were added to the airline's network - Beijing and Nouakchott. However, Beijing and Kinshasa never became a reality.

=== Suspended operations: 2011 ===
As a consequence of the First Libyan Civil War and the resulting no-fly zone over the country enforced by NATO, in accordance with the United Nations Security Council Resolution 1973, all flight operations by Afriqiyah Airways were terminated on 17 March 2011.

Point 17 of the United Nations resolution specifically banned flights into members of the United Nations by aircraft registered in Libya (5A). This was to have been rescinded when Afriqiyah Airways was officially 'unsanctioned' on 22 September 2011, when Libyan-registered aircraft should have been again permitted to enter EU airspace. This did not happen and up to 5 March 2013 however no such easing had been announced and Libyan-registered aircraft are still banned from Europe, even overflying through the airspace. The Tripoli - Istanbul route has to route further east, via over Alexandria, which adds an hour each way to the sector time. Afriqiyah Airways announced that they expected to resume flights between Tripoli and London by the end of the year, subject to the issuance of air transport and security permits, using A320 equipment. However, flights did not resume until 3 July 2012. In order to get round the EU ban, Afriqiyah wet-leased an A320 (ER-AXP) from Air Moldova that complied with the EU requirements.

=== Rebuilding post-war services: 2012 onwards ===
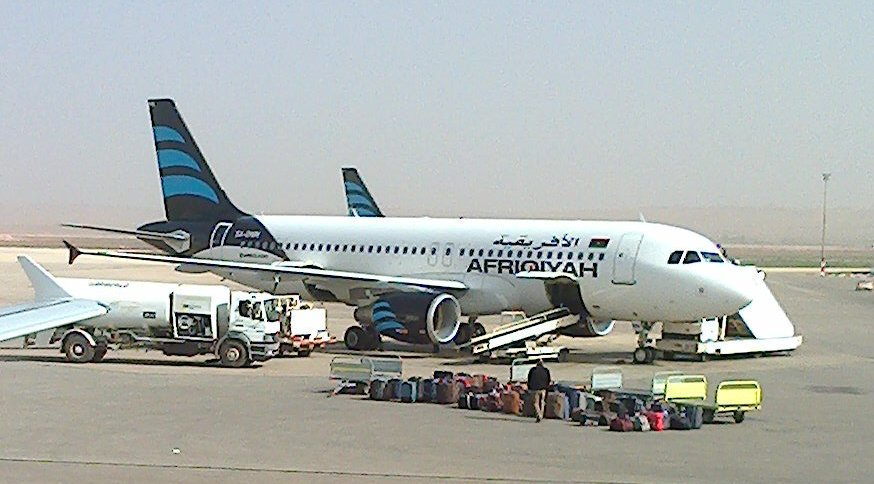
Afriqiyah Airways Airbus A320-200 painted in the current livery

After suffering badly during the civil war, Afriqiyah Airways expressed renewed optimism in the future on 12 November 2012 when it increased its order for Airbus A350 aircraft, announcing a new firm order for four A350-900s, and converting its original order for six A350-800s to six of the larger A350-900 model, taking the total number of A350s on order to 10 A350-900s. Deliveries were scheduled to start in 2020, and the airline planned to deploy the aircraft on new routes to the United States, the Middle East and Asia. .

On 19 December 2012, the airline unveiled its new livery, featuring a white fuselage and black tail fin adorned with three blue stripes, representing the neck markings of the turtle dove. The design replaced the former 9.9.99 tail fin logo.

The airline's hub, Tripoli International Airport, was shut down on 13 July 2014 and remains closed to all passenger and cargo flights as of July 2020. Afriqiyah Airways instead currently operates a small route network out of Mitiga International Airport.

Following the civil war and EU airspace ban; the order and delivery of the 10 A350-900s began being indefinitely deferred, but Airbus has kept the aircraft active on its global order books for years. In 2020, it was decided that the A350 order shall be swapped out for the A321neos to fit the downsized, regional Mediterranean and North African network, which Airbus agreed to in principle, but the order books were never legally modified.

== Merger ==
The Libyan government had announced its intention to merge the airline and Libyan Airlines in 2008, forming a single umbrella entity, the LAAHC ( Libyan African Aviation Holding Company) , targeting a 2010 merger of operations. Both airlines have been consolidated as wholly-owned subsidiaries of LAAHC this parent company, with consolidations of ground handling, catering, maintenance and procurement, between 2007 and 2010. However, the initial 2010 deadline to fully merge both airlines into one was missed - as with several subsequent deadlines - mostly due to instability and civil war in the region, including the extensive targeting of aviation assets, including in the Battle of Tripoli Airport in 2014. Late in 2014; all Libyan airlines were once again banned from EU airspace causing further complications. From 2014, the merger had effectively ground to a halt. By 2025, there had been heavy fleet depletion between both airlines; in response the Libyan Ministry of Transport had moved away from merging legacy frameworks, instead to establish a new unified national brand called Libyan United Airlines. To facilitate this, they entered a strategic partnership with Boeing in May 2026 to conduct feasibility studies, manage infrastructure redevelopment, and structure fleet modernization for the unified sector. As of September 2026, no firm dates have been released for the eventual merger of the two airlines.

== Airline partnerships ==
Afriqyah Airways has a Interline agreement with Hahn Air. and a partnership with ASL Airlines Ireland.

== Corporate affairs ==
=== Ownership ===
Afriqiyah Airways is a subsidiary of the Libyan African Aviation Holding Company (LAAHC), itself owned by the Libyan National Social Fund, the Libyan National Investment Company, the Libya-Africa Investment Fund and the Libyan Foreign Investment Company; the airline is ultimately owned by the Libyan government. LAAHC is also the holding company for Libyan Airlines; although separate operations, a merger of the two carriers had been progressing slowly, though completion of the merger, expected in the first half of 2013 appear to have repeatedly been delayed, and in June 2014 it was reported that the merger was "not currently being worked on".

=== Corporate identity ===
The original logo is a reference to the Sirte Declaration.

The Gaddafi-era 9.9.99 logo on the side of Afriqiyah's aircraft referred to the date of the Sirte Declaration, signed on 9 September 1999. The declaration marked the formation of the African Union. On Muammar Gaddafi's orders, the date was placed on the fuselage of all of the aircraft when the airline was founded. Tom Little of the Libya Herald said "Gaddafi saw the declaration as one of his proudest achievements".

In 2012, the airline decided to use new branding to replace the previous one's association with Gaddafi. Saeed Al-Barouni, In-Flight Services and Catering Manager, created a new logo that was selected from a pool of sixty proposals. The logo, made up of three blue stripes, is based on the neck markings of turtle doves. The new branding was unveiled on 19 December 2012 at the Rixos Al Nasr Hotel in Tripoli.

=== Business trends ===
Scant management data for Afriqiyah Airways have been published, even before the civil war of 2011. Mainly based on statements by airline or government officials, or AFRAA reports, trends for recent years are shown below (for years ending 31 December):

	2007	2008	2009	2010	2011	2012	2013	2014	2015	2016	2017	2018
Turnover (LDm)			180	183	184	195	205					
Turnover (US$m)	124	130	135	138	140	145	163					
Net profit (LDm)												
Net profit (US$m)												
Number of employees	c. 287	c. 835	c.1,080	c.1,300	c.1,463	c.1,635	c.1,880			1,086		
Number of passengers (m)	0.7	0.9	1.4	2.3	0.4	0.8	1.2					0.5
Passenger load factor (%)	n/a	n/a	n/a	n/a	n/a	n/a	n/a					76
Number of aircraft (at year end)										12	6	15
Notes/sources					Civil war March→							

== Fleet ==
=== Current fleet ===
As of July 2026, Afriqiyah Airways operates the following aircraft:

Afriqiyah Airways fleet
Aircraft	In Service	Orders	Passengers			Notes
Aircraft	In Service	Orders	B	E	Total	Notes
Airbus A319	1	—	16	96	112	
Airbus A320	5	—	16	126	142	
Airbus A330-300	2	—	28	263	291	
Total	8	—				

=== Former fleet ===
As of August 2025, Afriqiyah Airways operated 1 Airbus A319, 5 Airbus A320 and 2 Airbus A330-300.

- 2 Airbus A300-600
- 4 Boeing 737-400 (leased from Blue Panorama Airlines and Lauda Air)
- 1 Airbus A340-200
- 4 Airbus A330-200 (one crashed as Afriqiyah Airways Flight 771)

== Accidents and incidents ==
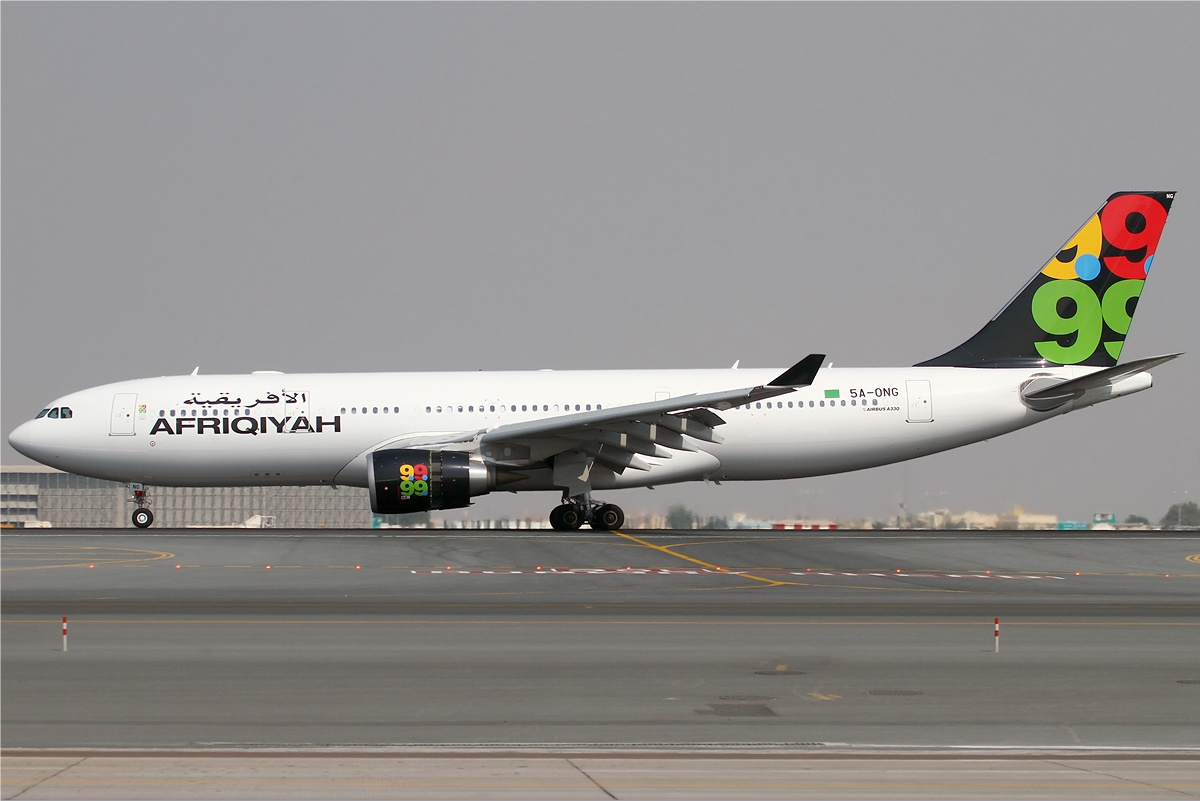
5A-ONG, the Airbus A330-200 involved in the crash of Flight 771

- On 12 May 2010, at 04:10 UTC (06:10 Tripoli time) an Airbus A330-202, flying from Johannesburg in South Africa to Tripoli as Afriqiyah Airways Flight 771 crashed on approach to Tripoli International Airport. 11 crew members and 92 passengers were killed. The sole survivor was a nine-year-old Dutch boy.
- On 25 August 2011, two Afriqiyah jets were caught in the middle of a crossfire battle at Tripoli Airport. The former, an Airbus A300B4 registered 5A-IAY, was totalled and written off when a grenade hit the aircraft, while an Airbus A320, 5A-ONK, bore severe damage when an RPG hit the wing root, possibly puncturing the centre wing tank in the process.
- On 20 July 2014, two Airbus A330 aircraft with registrations 5A-ONF and 5A-ONP were hit by rockets fired by one of the rival militias (Misratah and Zintan) fighting for control of the facility at Tripoli International Airport. 5A-ONF exploded, burned to the ground and was written off; 5A-ONP suffered minor to moderate damage, and was stored in Hamburg before being broken up in November 2025.
