= List of airports in Tunisia =

This is a list of airports in Tunisia, sorted by location.

== List ==
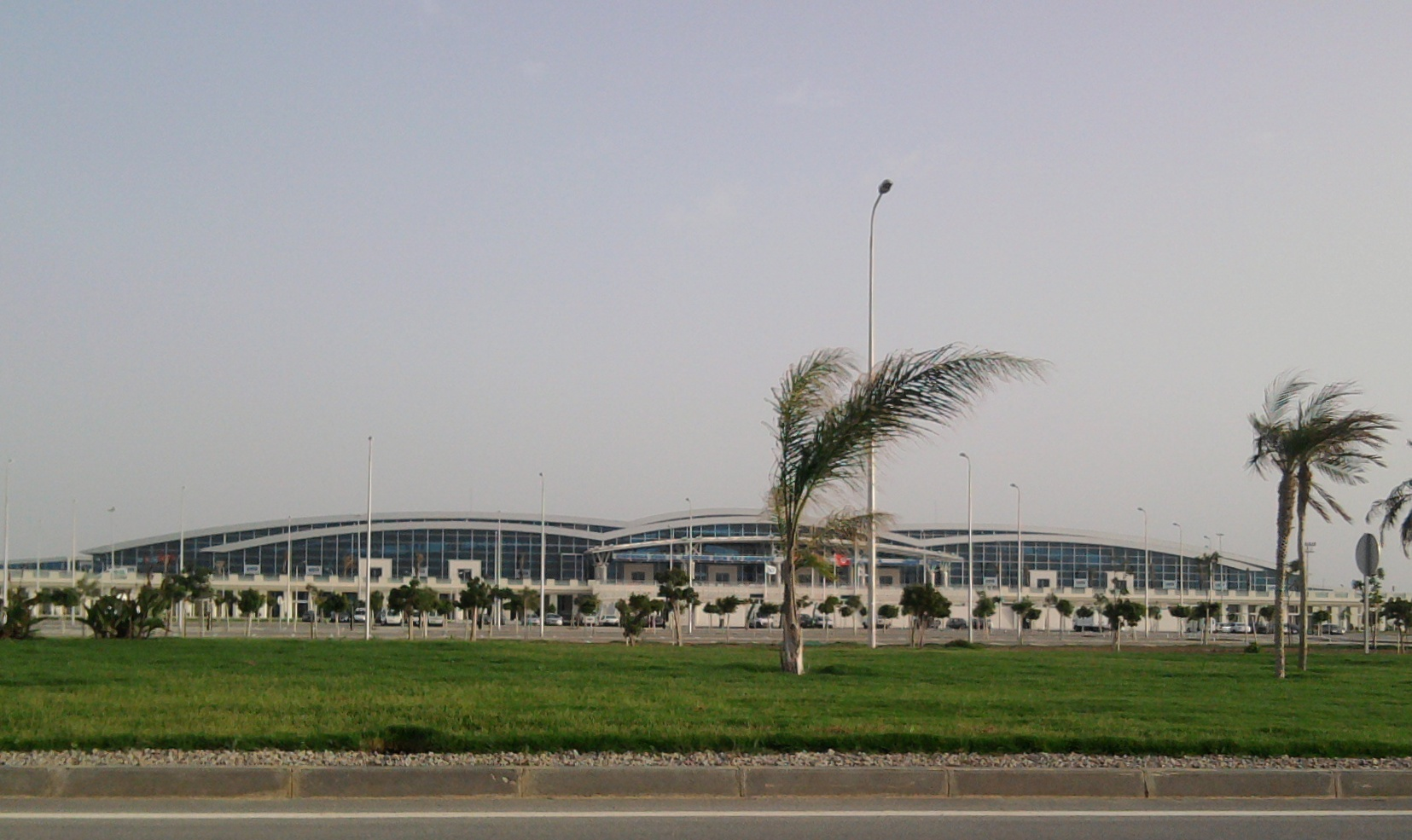
Enfidha – Hammamet International Airport

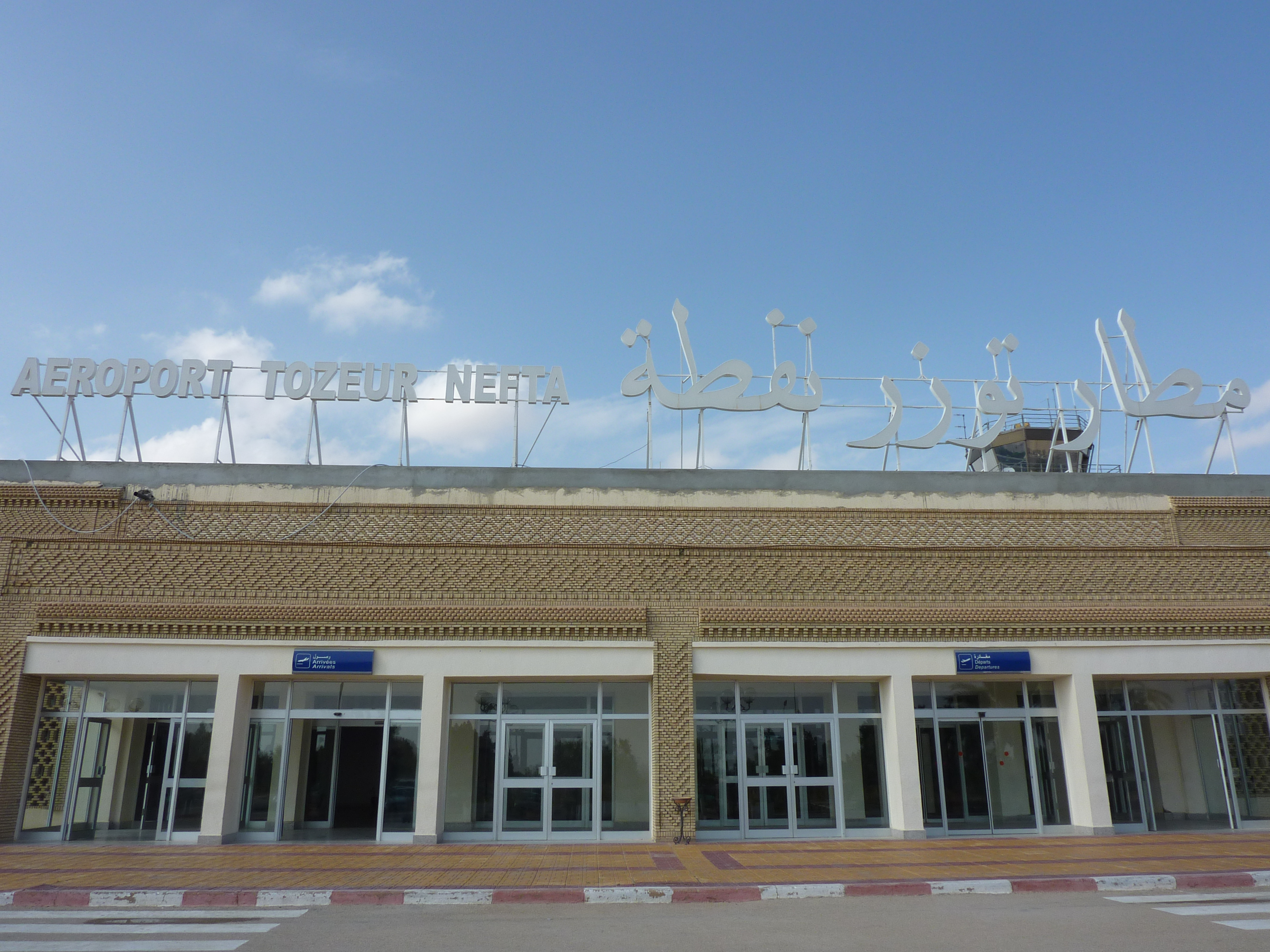
Tozeur - Nefta International Airport

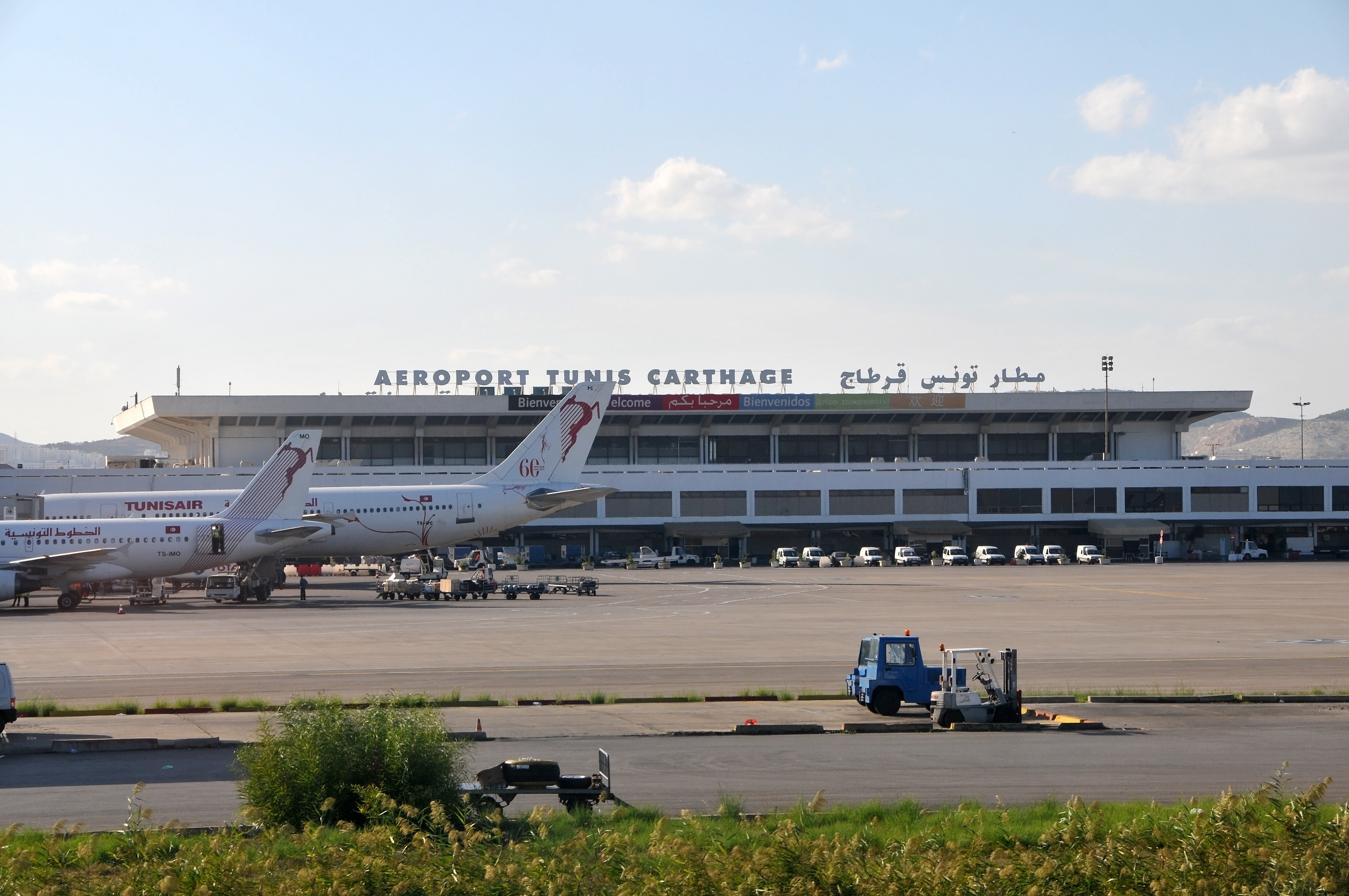
Tunis - Carthage International Airport

ICAO location identifiers link to airport page at Office de l'Aviation Civile et des Aeroports (OACA), the Tunisian Civil Aviation & Airports Authority.

Airport names shown in bold indicate the airport has scheduled service on commercial airlines.

**City**	**Governorate**	**ICAO**	**IATA**	**Airport name**	**Coordinates**
Bizerte	Bizerte	DTTB		Bizerte-Sidi Ahmed Air Base (military)	37°14′44″N 009°47′29″E
Borj El Amri	Manouba	DTTI		Borj El Amri Airport	36°43′16″N 009°56′35″E
Djerba	Medenine	DTTJ	DJE	**Djerba - Zarzis International Airport**	33°52′30″N 010°46′31″E
El Borma	Tataouine	DTTR	EBM	El Borma Airport	31°42′15″N 009°15′17″E
Enfidha	Sousse	DTNH	NBE	**Enfidha – Hammamet International Airport**	36°05′31″N 010°24′50″E
Gabès	Gabès	DTTG	GAE	Gabès - Matmata International Airport (civil/military)	33°44′0.13″N 9°55′5.55″E
Gafsa	Gafsa	DTTF	GAF	Gafsa - Ksar International Airport (civil/military)	34°25′19″N 008°49′21″E
Kasserine	Kasserine			Thelepte Airfield	35°00′15″N 008°35′37″E
Monastir	Monastir	DTMB	MIR	**Monastir Habib Bourguiba International Airport**	35°45′29″N 010°45′17″E
Remada	Tataouine	DTTD		Remada Air Base (military)	32°18′22″N 010°22′56″E
Sfax	Sfax	DTTX	SFA	**Sfax - Thyna International Airport**	34°43′04″N 010°41′27″E
Soliman	Nabeul			Soliman Airstrip	36°42′31″N 010°26′56″E
Tabarka	Jendouba	DTKA	TBJ	Tabarka–Ain Draham International Airport	36°58′48″N 008°52′37″E
Tozeur	Tozeur	DTTZ	TOE	**Tozeur - Nefta International Airport**	33°56′23″N 008°06′38″E
Tunis	Tunis	DTTA	TUN	**Tunis - Carthage International Airport**	36°51′04″N 10°13′38″E

== See also ==
- Transport in Tunisia
- Tunisian Air Force
- List of airports by ICAO code: D#DT - Tunisia
- Wikipedia:WikiProject Aviation/Airline destination lists: Africa#Tunisia
