= Tunisair Express =

Tunisian airline

IATA	ICAO	Call sign
UG	TUX	TUNEXPRESS
- Founded: 1991
- Hubs: Tunis-Carthage International Airport
- Fleet size: 2
- Destinations: 12
- Parent company: Tunisair
- Headquarters: Tunis, Tunisia
- Key people: Montacer Bnouni, General Manager
- Website: tunisairexpress.com.tn

Tunisair Express (French: Société des Lignes Intérieures et Internationales, Arabic: الخطوط التونسية السريعة) is an airline based in Tunis, Tunisia that was founded on 1 August 1991. Formerly known as Tuninter (Arabic: الخطوط الدولية) and SevenAir (Arabic: طيران السابع), its parent company is the national carrier Tunisair. It operates to destinations within Tunisia as well as some services to Italy, France, and Malta.

== History ==
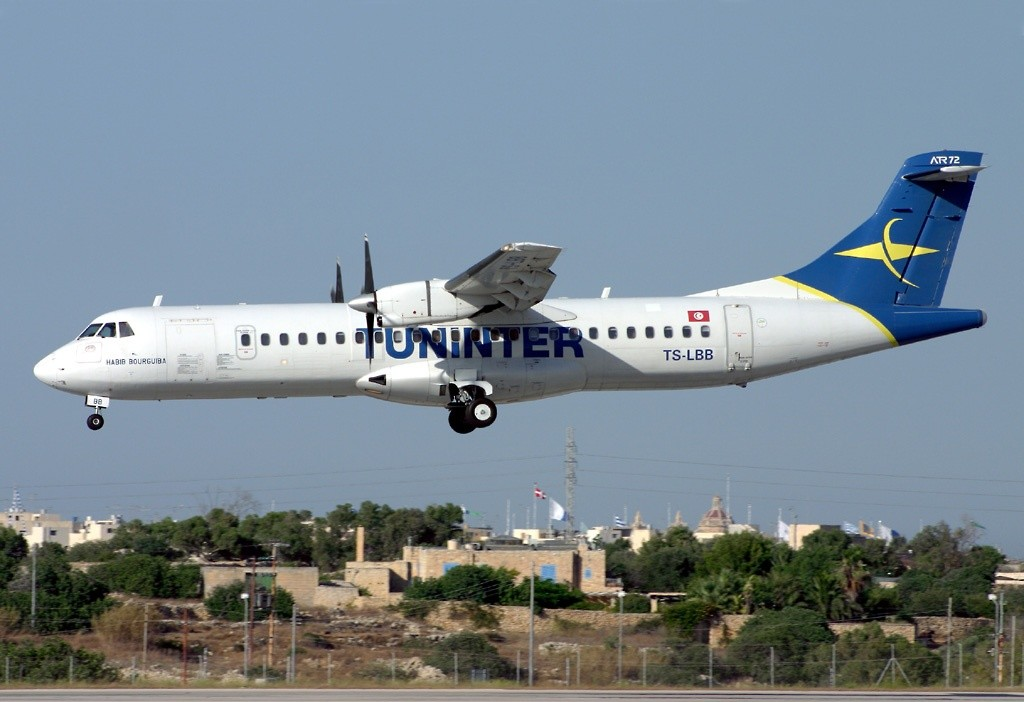
Tuninter ATR 72-202, in 2004. The aircraft in photo would later crash as Flight 1153 in the following year

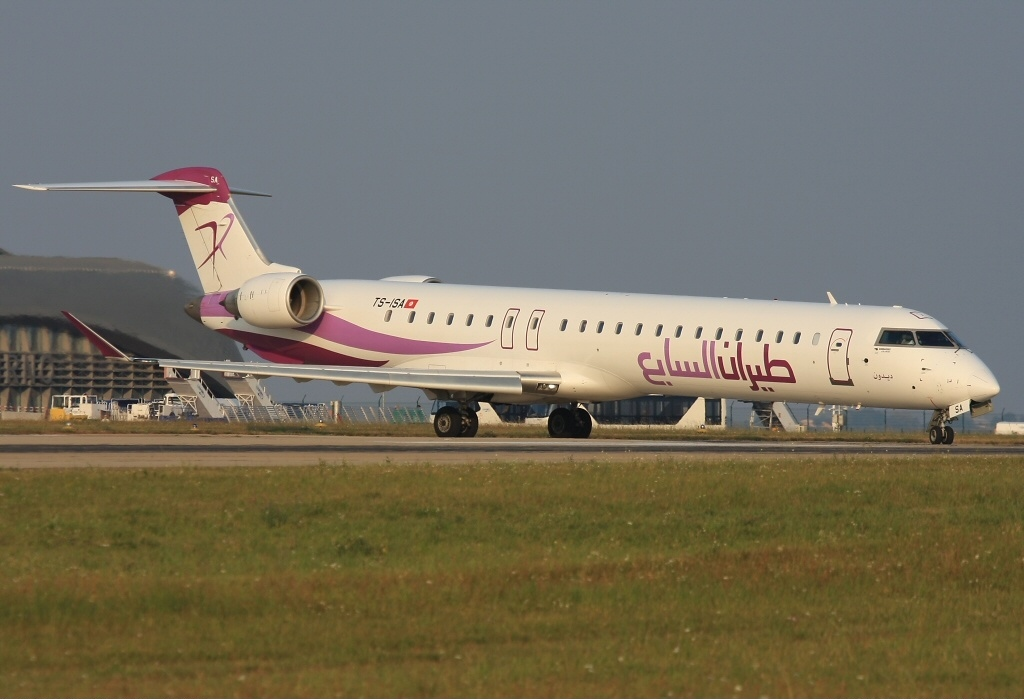
Sevenair Bombardier CRJ-900, 2009

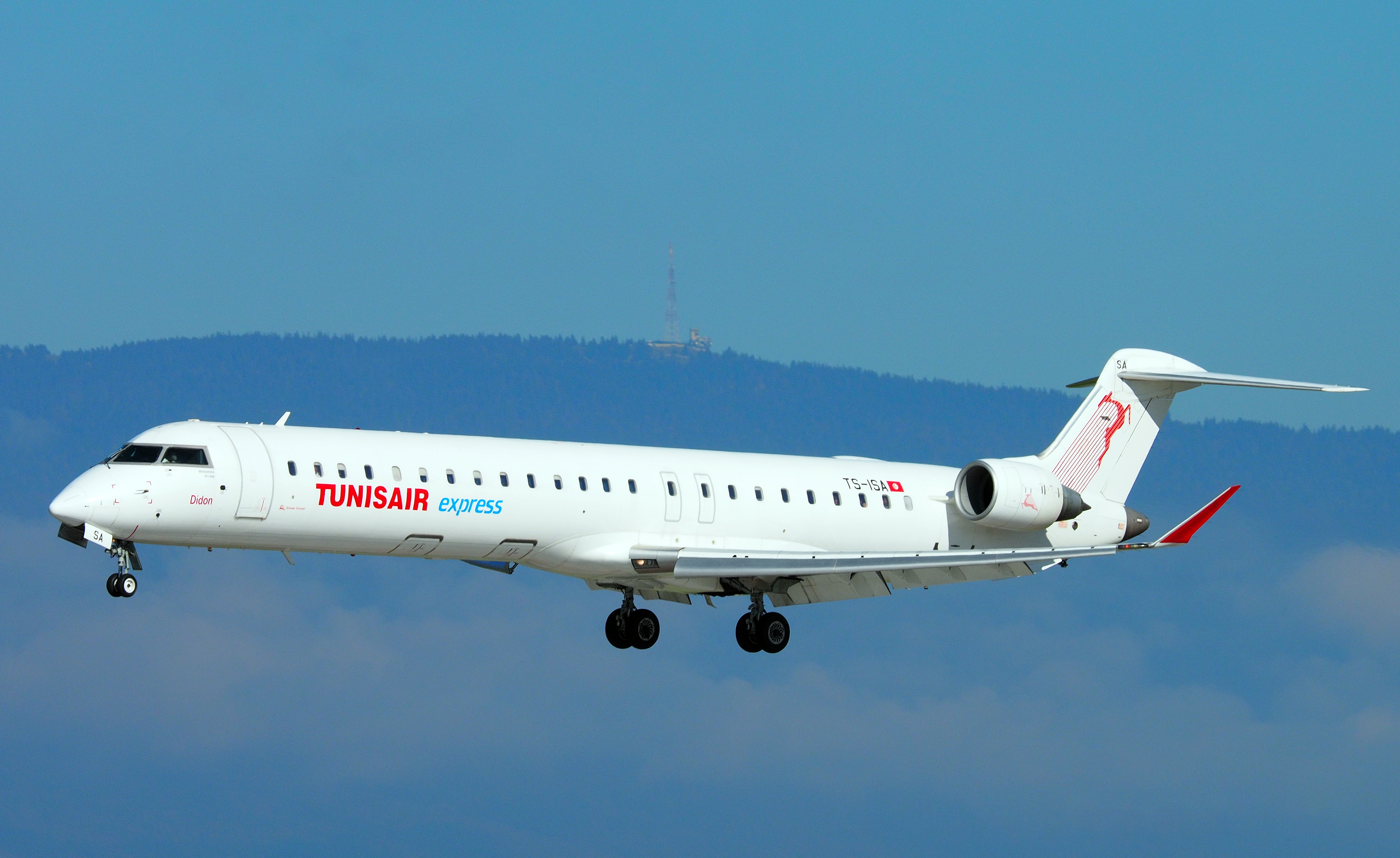
Tunisair Express CRJ-900, 2014

From its founding in 1990 until 2000, Tunisair Express was known as Tuninter, and bore the Arabic name "Domestic Airline" (الخطوط الداخلية). Initially limited to domestic routes, Tuninter obtained permission to begin international operations in 2000. On 7 July 2007 (7/7/7), the airline was renamed "SevenAir" (Compagnie Aérienne Sevenair Tunisie, طيران السابع). SevenAir was owned by a relative of the wife of the then-President of Tunisia, Zine El-Abidine Ben Ali, and was renamed TunisAir Express following Ben Ali's departure from Tunisia on 14 January 2011. Tunisair Express transported a total of six million passengers between 1992 and 2008, carrying 300,000 passengers in 2008.

In December 2015, it was announced that Tunisair Express would be merged into Tunisair in the foreseeable future to achieve a better profitability.

== Management ==
On 16 October 2015, the Board of Directors appointed Béchir Ben Sassi as Chief Executive Officer, replacing Khaled Chelly, who was appointed CEO of the Civil Aviation and Airports Authority.

Ilyes Kerfahi became CEO on 31 January 2017, followed by Yosr Chouari on 4 July 2018.

On 12 March 2021, the Ministry of Transport and Logistics announced the appointment of Khaled Chelly as CEO of Tunisair and its subsidiaries, including Tunisair Express.

In June 2023, Hatem Motemri was appointed CEO of Tunisair Express.

Montacer Bnouni was appointed as Director General of Tunisair Express in June 2024.

== Destinations ==
As of November 2024, Tunisair Express operates scheduled passenger flights to the following destinations:

City	Country	Airport	Notes
Djerba	Tunisia	Djerba–Zarzis International Airport	
Sfax	Tunisia	Sfax–Thyna International Airport	
Tozeur	Tunisia	Tozeur–Nefta International Airport	
Tabarka	Tunisia	Tabarka-Ain Draham International Airport	
Gafsa	Tunisia	Gafsa – Ksar International Airport	
Gabès	Tunisia	Gabès – Matmata International Airport	
El Borma	Tunisia	El Borma Airport	border town
Tunis	Tunisia	Tunis-Carthage International Airport	
Malta	Malta	Malta International Airport	
Monastir	Tunisia	Monastir Habib Bourguiba International Airport	
Palermo	Italy	Palermo International Airport	
Naples	Italy	Naples International Airport	

== Fleet ==
As of August 2025, Tunisair Express operates the following aircraft:

Tunisair Express fleet
Aircraft	In service	Orders	Passengers	Notes
ATR 72-600	2	—	72	
Total	2			

== Accidents and incidents ==
- 6 August 2005, Tuninter Flight 1153; while on a flight from the Italian city of Bari to the island of Djerba in Tunisia, a Tuninter ATR 72 suffered fuel exhaustion and was forced to make an emergency landing into the Mediterranean Sea, 18 miles off Palermo, Sicily. The aircraft was carrying 39 passengers and crew, 16 of whom died. Officials at Bari airport reported that most of the passengers were Italian tourists. The aircraft had recently been fitted with an incorrect fuel indicator designed to be fitted only in a smaller version of this plane: the ATR 42. Therefore, the crew were unable to detect that the aircraft was running low on fuel. The airline was banned from flying into Italy for almost two years.
