= Monastir Habib Bourguiba International Airport =

Airport in Tunisia

Monastir Habib Bourguiba International Airport Aéroport International de Monastir–Habib Bourguiba

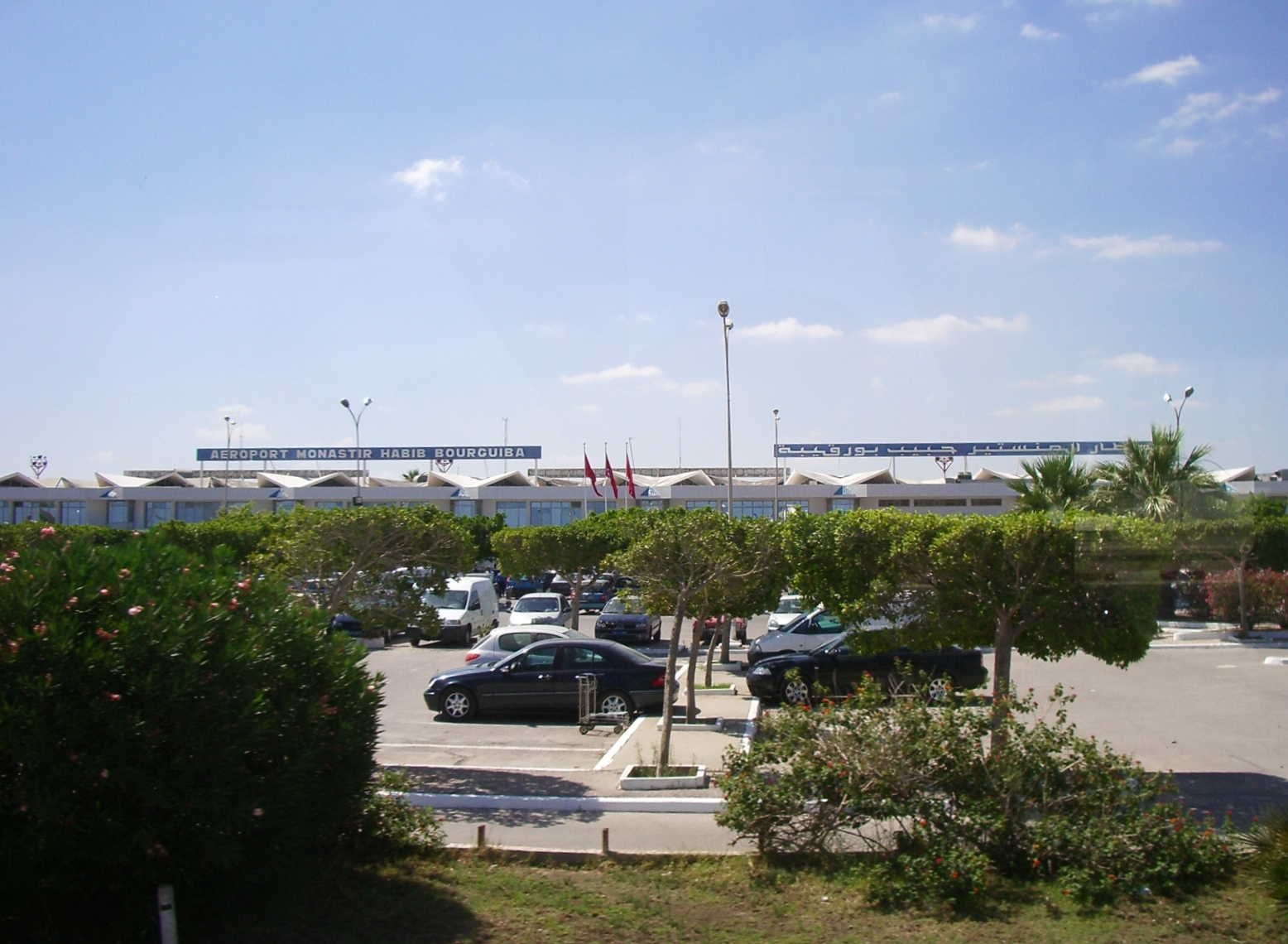
- IATA: MIR; ICAO: DTMB

Summary
- Airport type: Public
- Operator: TAV Airports Holding
- Serves: Monastir, Tunisia
- Hub for: Nouvelair
- Elevation AMSL: 9 ft (2.7 m)
- Coordinates: 35°45′29″N 010°45′17″E
- Website: habibbourguibaairport.com

Map
- Location of airport in Tunisia

Runways
Direction	Length		Surface
Direction	m	ft	Surface
07/25	2,903	9,524	Asphalt

Statistics (2024)
- Passengers: 1,634,374
- Source: List of the busiest airports in Africa, DAFIF

Monastir Habib Bourguiba International Airport (French: Aéroport International de Monastir–Habib Bourguiba, AIMHB, Arabic: مطار الحبيب بورقيبة الدولي) (IATA: MIR, ICAO: DTMB) is an airport serving Monastir and Sousse areas in Tunisia. The Tunisian Civil Aviation and Airports Authority (OACA) awarded the management of the airport to TAV Airports Holding in March 2007. The airport is named after former president Habib Bourguiba (1903–2000), who was born in Monastir.

== History ==
During World War II, the airport was known as Monastir Airfield and was used by the United States Army Air Forces Twelfth Air Force 81st Fighter Group during the North African Campaign. The 81st flew P-39 Airacobras from the airfield between 26 May and 10 August 1943.

== Overview ==
Monastir Airport first began operating in 1968 under the control of the Office of Civil Aviation and Airports. TAV Airport Holdings submitted its offer to the Tunisian Ministry of Transport, in January 2007 and was announced as the winning bid in May 2007, to operate the airport. The rights were given from 2008 and expire in May 2047

The airport activity mainly serves tourists coming to visit Monastir, Sousse and the surrounding resorts (Monastir-Skanes and Port El Kantaoui in particular). Almost all charter flights are concentrated within the tourist season. The main airlines operating currently at the airport are Nouvelair and Tunisair. With a capacity of 3.5 million passengers per year, the terminal covers 28,000 m^{2}. The airport led the country in terms of traffic with 4,279,802 passengers in 2007.

In 2019 Monastir airport recorded 1.586 million passengers. In 2021 (post Covid), the airport recorded 0.42 million. For 2022 and 2023 passenger numbers increased to 1.01 million and 1.5 million passengers, respectively. In 2024, the number of passengers continue its increase to reach 1.6 million.

== Airlines and destinations ==
The following airlines operate regular scheduled and charter flights at Monastir Airport:

Airlines	Destinations
Air Algérie	Seasonal: Algerie, Constantine, Oran
Air Serbia	Belgrade, Niš
Animawings	Bucharest, Craiova, Cluj, Timisoara
Austrian Airlines	Seasonal charter: Vienna
Brussels Airlines	Seasonal: Brussels
Croatia Airlines	Seasonal charter: Zagreb
Discover Airlines	Seasonal: Frankfurt, Munich
Enter Air	Katowice, Porto, Warsaw
Eurowings	Seasonal: Cologne, Düsseldorf
HelloJets	Prague
Helvetic Airways	Seasonal: Bern
HiSky	Bucharest, Iași, Oradea Sibiu Timisoara; Seasonal charter: Cluj
Iberojet	Madrid
Luxair	Seasonal: Luxembourg
Neos	Djerba, Milan-Malpensa
Nouvelair	Belgrade, Berlin, Brussels, Düsseldorf, Frankfurt, Gdańsk, Hannover, Katowice, Lille, Łódź, Lyon, Marseille, Nantes, Nice, Paris–Charles de Gaulle; Seasonal: Leipzig/Halle, Lisbon, Ljubljana, Lubin, Moscow, Munich, Rzeszów, Poznań, Saint Petersburg, Salzburg, Sarajevo, Skopje, Stuttgart, Vienna, Warsaw, Wroclaw, Yerevan; Seasonal charter: Lisbon, Porto, Saint Petersburg
Pyramids Airlines	Seasonal cherter: Moscow-Sheremtyevo, Saint Petersburg
Smartwings	Bratislava, Brno, České, Debrecen, Košice, Oradea, Ostrava, Pardubice, Poprad, Prague
Sundair	Seasonal: Berlin, Bremen
Transavia	Lyon, Nantes, Paris–Orly; Seasonal: Nice
Tunisair	Hamburg, Lyon, Marseille, Munich, Nice, Paris–Orly

== Access ==
The airport is served by trains on the electrified, metre-gauge Sahel Metro line and between Sousse and Gare Habib Bourguiba Monastir.
