= TBJ =

TBJ is may refer to:

- Toronto Blue Jays, a Major League Baseball team
- Law & Order: Trial by Jury, an American television drama
- Tabarka-Ain Draham International Airport, IATA airport code
- The Basketball Jones, a former sports blog on The Score covering the NBA
