= EgyptAir Flight 843 =

2002 aviation accident in Tunisia

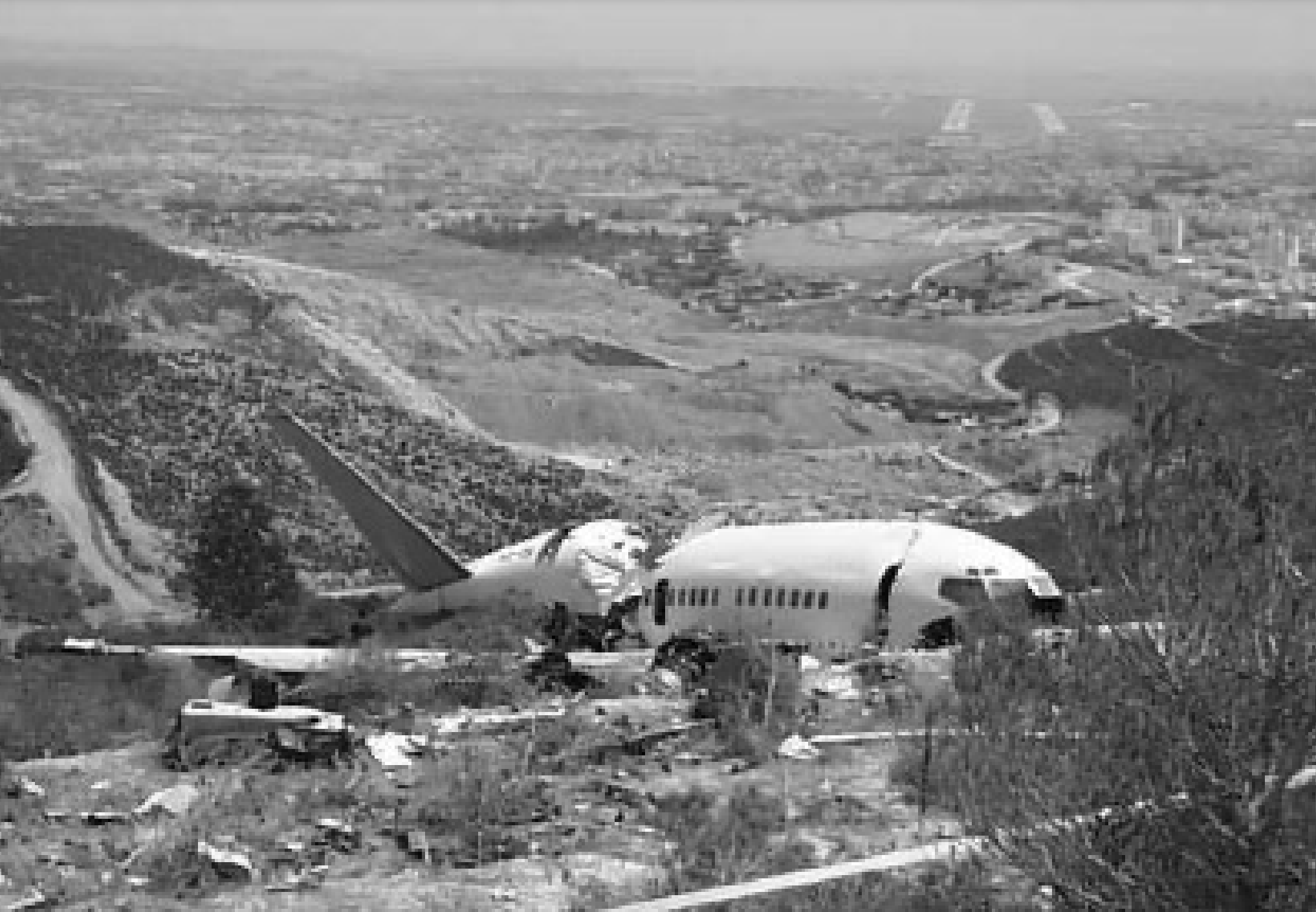
- Wreckage of the aircraft

Accident
- Date: 7 May 2002
- Summary: Controlled flight into terrain
- Site: Near Tunis–Carthage International Airport, Tunis, Tunisia; 36°52′36″N 010°08′55″E

Aircraft
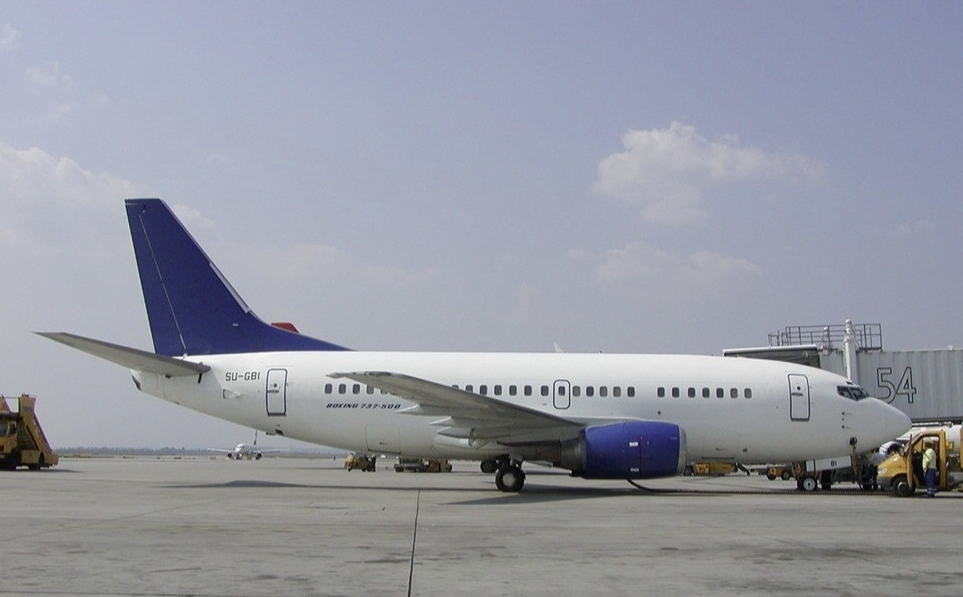
- SU-GBI, the aircraft involved in the accident, seen in 2001
- Aircraft type: Boeing 737-566
- Aircraft name: Abu Simbel
- Operator: EgyptAir
- IATA flight No.: MS843
- ICAO flight No.: MSR843
- Call sign: EGYPTAIR 843
- Registration: SU-GBI
- Flight origin: Cairo International Airport, Cairo, Egypt
- Destination: Tunis–Carthage International Airport, Tunis, Tunisia
- Occupants: 62
- Passengers: 56
- Crew: 6
- Fatalities: 14
- Injuries: 28
- Survivors: 48

EgyptAir Flight 843 was a flight from Cairo International Airport to Tunis–Carthage International Airport. On 7 May 2002, the Boeing 737-566 on the route crashed into a hill near Tunis–Carthage International Airport. Of the 6 crew members and 56 passengers, 3 crew members and 11 passengers died, making a total of 14 fatalities.

== Accident summary ==
Flight 843 took off from Cairo International Airport on the afternoon of 7 May 2002 to Tunis Carthage International Airport in Tunis, Tunisia. The passengers consisted of 27 Egyptians, 16 Tunisians, 3 Algerians, 3 Jordanians, and 2 Britons. The aircraft was a Boeing 737-566. The flight crew members were 34-year-old Captain Ashraf Abdel-Aal (Arabic: أشرف عبدالعال) and 28-year-old First Officer Khaled Odeh (Arabic: خالد عودة).

The plane was flying in instrument meteorological conditions (IMC) due to fog, rain and blowing sand on approach to runway 11 of Tunis-Carthage Airport. The aircraft crashed atop a hill in the Nahli area in the north of Tunis on a VOR/DME approach. The flight crew did not conduct a verbal approach briefing prior to descent. Furthermore, the pilot and co-pilot made a premature descent at 6.8 DME rather than 6 DME. The aircraft was too old to have warning systems, if this happened on a newer aircraft, it would warn the pilots using an automated voice system in the cockpit "Too-Low Terrain" or "Pull up". As a result of this, the aircraft came to rest at an elevation of 750 feet (230 m) above sea level and 4 miles (3.5 nmi; 6.4 km) from the airport. Of the 6 crew and 56 passengers on board, 3 crew members (both flight crew members and one flight attendant) and 11 passengers were killed in the crash. The investigation found the Minimum safe altitude warning device at Tunis-Carthage did not cover the approach for Runway 11, and recommended studying ways to improve the volume of sky covered by the device in order to cover approaches to all the runways. The cause of the crash was a failure to execute and control the final approach.

The plane broke into two halves and the back of the plane caught fire. As a result, most of the victims were sitting in the back of the plane. Rescue teams headed to the crash area to rescue the injured passengers and retrieve the bodies of those killed. Rescue workers reported having difficulty reaching the site of the crash in the rough terrain.

== Contributing Factors ==
Contributing factors to the crash included the adverse weather conditions on the day of the flight, the limitations in the training of both pilots, particularly in regard to VOR/DME approaches, and the relative weakness of the flight experience of the crew operating the flight.

== Survivor accounts ==
One of the survivors said that "the plane had left Egypt normally, but when we entered the Tunisian airspace we found an unusual climatic situation that I had not seen since the year. And we stayed for about half an hour between the fog and could not see the surface of the Earth at all," adding that "while the pilot was preparing to land at the airport in Tunisia, the plane suddenly crashed into the mountain, and that maybe something wrong from the pilot and something from the plane."

== Aftermath ==
After the accident, the U.S. National Transportation Safety Board sent a team of investigators to assist authorities in Tunisia with their investigation. The team included representatives from Boeing and General Electric Engines.

== See also ==
- EgyptAir Flight 990
- EgyptAir Flight 648
- List of accidents and incidents involving commercial aircraft
