= Nouvelair =

Tunisian airline

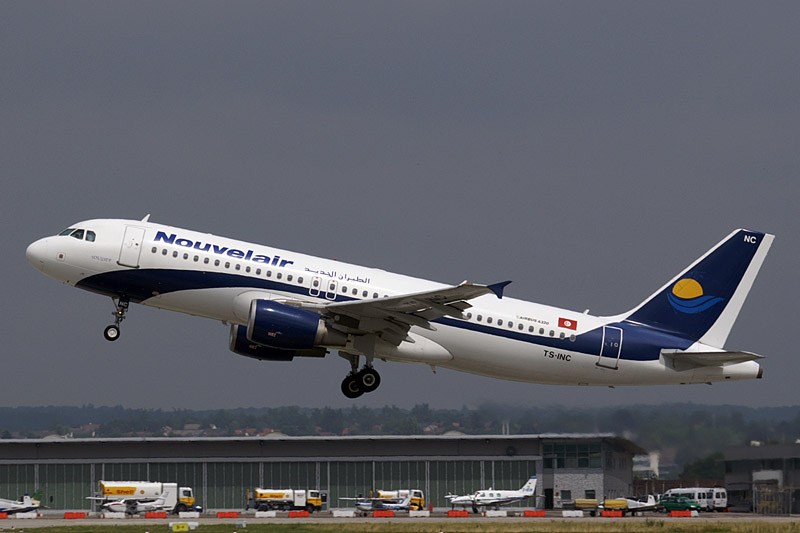
IATA	ICAO	Call sign
BJ	LBT	NOUVELAIR
- Founded: 1989; 37 years ago (as Air Liberté Tunisie)
- Commenced operations: 21 March 1990; 36 years ago
- Operating bases: Djerba; Monastir; Tunis
- Frequent-flyer program: jasmin
- Fleet size: 16
- Destinations: 25
- Headquarters: Monastir, Tunisia
- Key people: Chokri Zarrad (CEO)
- Website: www.nouvelair.com/en

Nouvelair Limited Company (French: Nouvelair Société Anonyme, Arabic: الطيران الجديد تونس), trading as Nouvelair Tunisie, or simply Nouvelair, is a Tunisian airline with its registered office in Tunis, while its head office in the Dhkila Tourist Zone in Monastir, near the Hôtel Sahara Beach. The airline operates tourist charters from European cities to Tunisian holiday resorts. Its main bases are Monastir Habib Bourguiba International Airport, Tunis–Carthage International Airport and Djerba–Zarzis International Airport.

== History ==
The airline was established in 1989 as Air Liberté Tunisie and started operations on 21 March 1990. It was founded as a charter affiliate of French operator Air Liberté. It was majority owned by Aziz Miled (who died in 2012) and had 614 employees in March 2007.

== Corporate affairs ==
=== Ownership and management ===
The airline is privately owned. Current shareholders are (July 2014) Tunisian Travel Service (TTS) (55%), Sofiat (20%), Carte (15%) and Marhaba Hotels (10%).

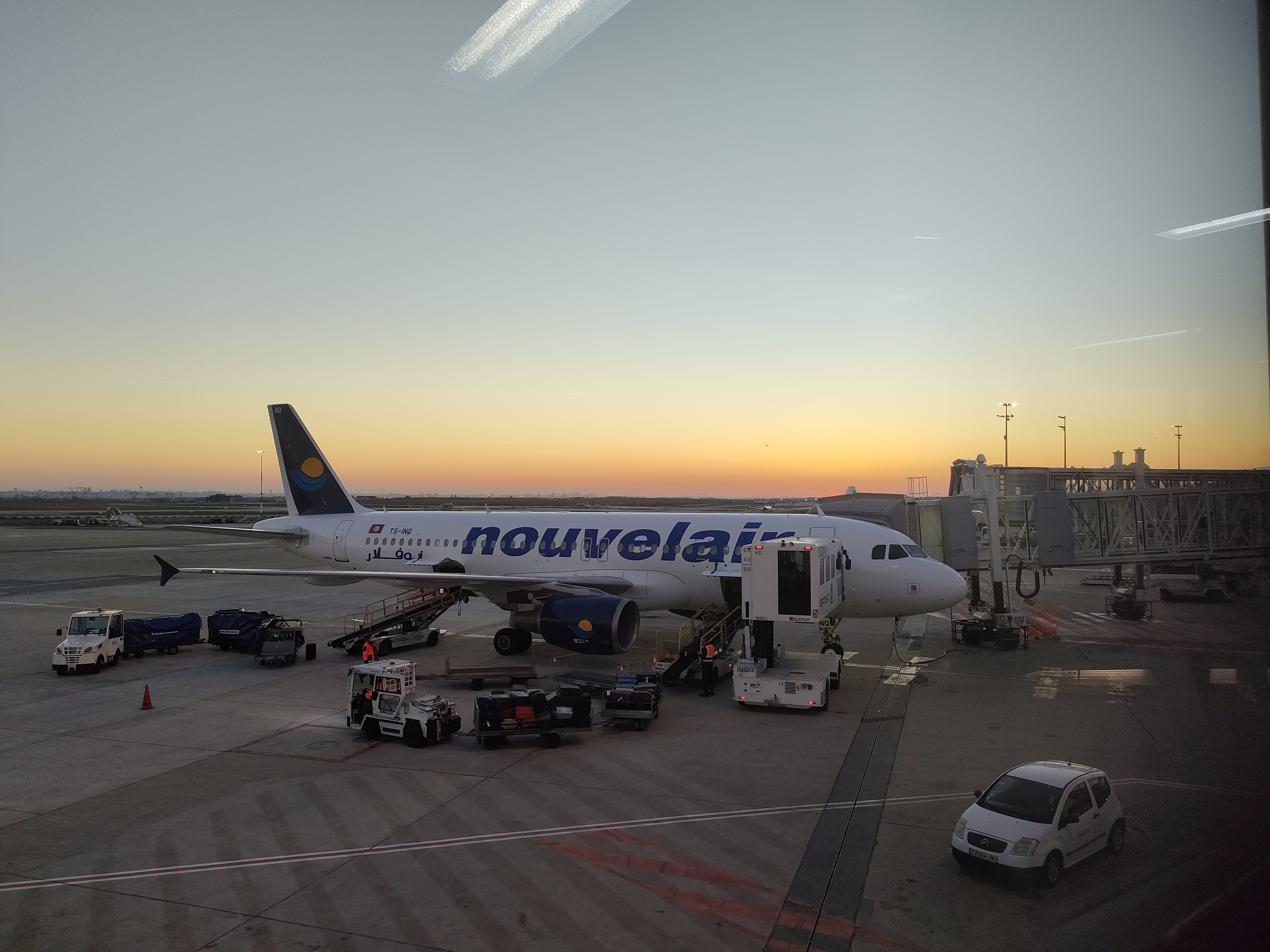
Airbus A320 à l'aéroport de Paris-Charles-de-Gaulle

The CEO is Chokri Zarrad.

=== Business trends ===
Full annual reports do not appear to be published. In the absence of these, available information on trends is shown below (for years ending 31 December):

	2007	2008	2009	2010	2011	2012	2013	2014	2015	2016	2017	2018
Turnover (TND m)											391	
Net profit (TND m)												
Number of employees							617	615	616	614	520	568
Number of passengers (m)	1.78	1.81	1.48	1.65	1.01	1.24	1.20	1.34	0.71	0.57	0.92	0.65
Passenger load factor (%)											81.3	80
Number of aircraft (at year end)	14	14	15	17	13	12	11	11	10	9	8	10
Notes/sources												

== Fleet ==
=== Current fleet ===
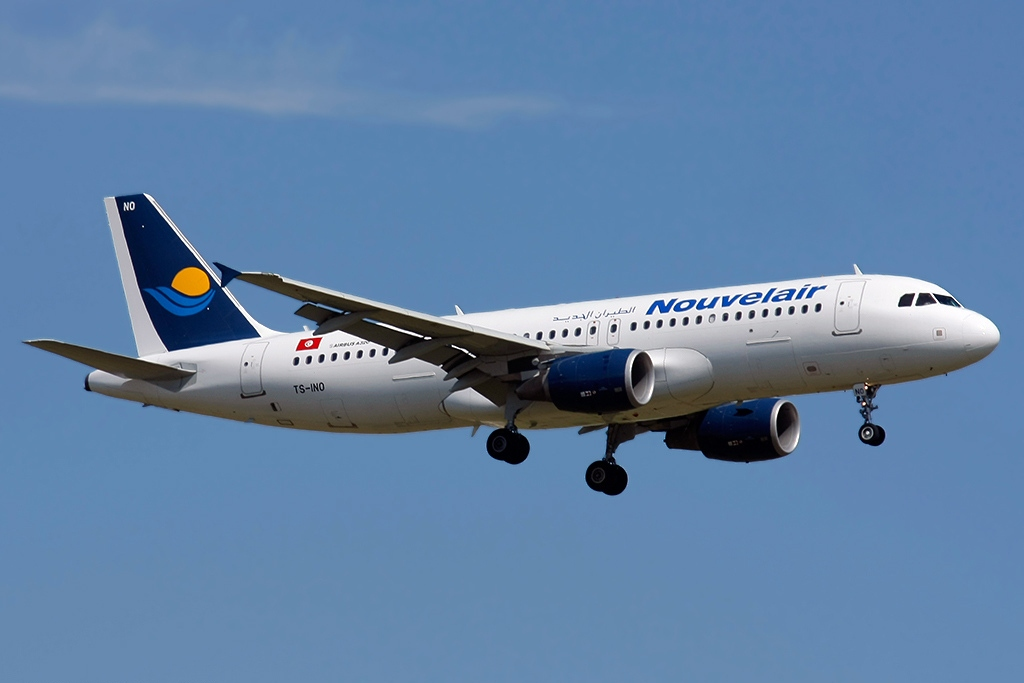
Nouvelair Airbus A320-200

As of August 2025, Nouvelair operates the following aircraft:

Nouvelair fleet
Aircraft	In service	Orders	Passengers	Notes
Airbus A320-200	14	—	177	1 currently parked
Airbus A320-200	14	—	180	1 currently parked
Airbus A320neo	2	—		
Total	16	—		

== Accidents and incidents ==
- 3 November 1994: Air Liberté Tunisie Flight 930, a McDonnell Douglas MD-83 (F-GHED) operating a charter flight from Monastir, Tunisia to Kajaani, Finland, veered off the runway at Kajaani Airport. The pilots landed after inadvertently selecting the TO/GA buttons, which set the autothrottle to full power, causing the aircraft touched down overspeed, nose-first, and around 600 meters past the touchdown zone. The throttle setting meant the reverse thrust and spoilers were not deployed, and the heavy breaking applied by the pilots damaged the gear and destroyed the left wheel brakes. The aircraft turned 140 degrees and skidded off the right of the runway, coming to rest in the grass with the left gear collapsed. All passengers were evacuated. The aircraft was repaired and eventually returned to Air Liberté, where it was involved in the 2000 Charles de Gaulle runway collision.
- 21 September 2025: Nouvelair flight BJ586, an Airbus A320-214 (TS-INP) flying from Tunis, Tunisia to Nice, France, at approximately 21:32 UTC had attempted to land on runway 04R at Nice-Côte d’Azur Airport, while EasyJet flight U24706, another Airbus A320-214, was lined up on the same runway awaiting takeoff clearance. The captain of the EasyJet flight reportedly stated to the passengers that the Nouvelair flight had overflown the Easyjet A320 by 3 metres (ADS-B data reported a value of 50 ft with a margin of 25 ft; 50 ft ±25 ft). The Nouvelair flight performed a go-around and landed safely on runway 04L, 16 minutes later. The EasyJet flight had decided not to continue the flight and returned to the gate shortly after, with the flight subsequently cancelled. The METAR at Nice indicated the presence of thunderstorms in the vicinity of the airfield at the time of the incident. The French BEA has opened an investigation, classifying this as a serious incident.
