= Tunis–Carthage International Airport =

International airport serving Tunis, the capital city of Tunisia

Tunis–Carthage International Airport مطار تونس قرطاج الدولي
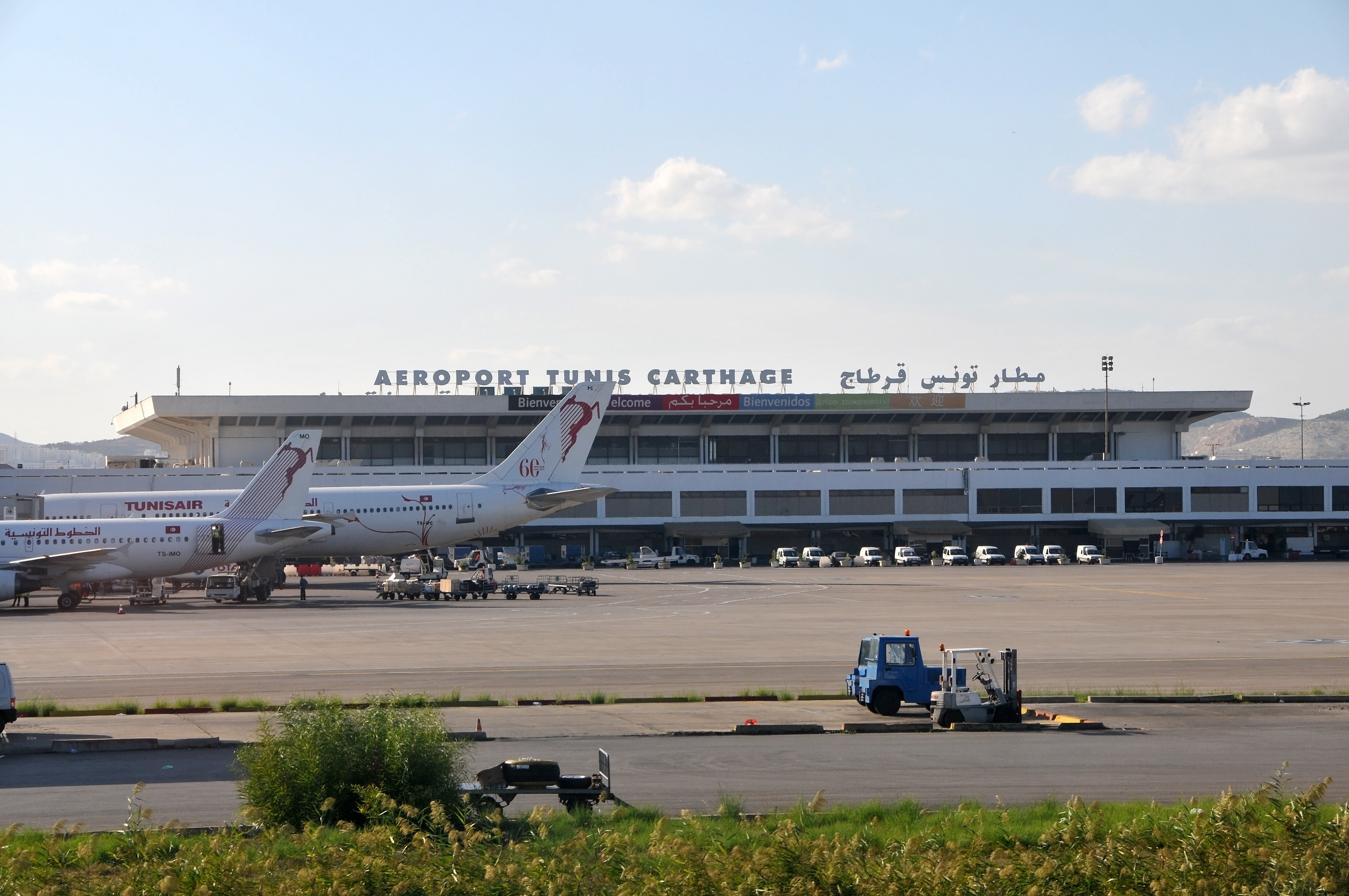
- IATA: TUN; ICAO: DTTA

Summary
- Airport type: Public/Military
- Operator: Tunisian Civil Aviation & Airports Authority
- Serves: Grand Tunis
- Location: Tunis, Tunisia
- Opened: 1944
- Hub for: Tunisair; Tunisair Express; Nouvelair
- Built: 1920
- Elevation AMSL: 22 ft (6.7 m)
- Coordinates: 36°51′04″N 010°13′38″E

Map
- Location of airport in Tunisia

Runways
| Direction | Length | | Surface |
| Direction | m | ft | Surface |
|---|---|---|---|
| 01/19 | 3,200 | 10,499 | Asphalt |
| 11/29 | 2,840 | 9,318 | Asphalt |

Statistics (2024)
- Passengers: 7,249,701
- Source: DAFIF

Tunis–Carthage International Airport (French: Aéroport de Tunis-Carthage, Arabic: مطار تونس قرطاج الدولي, IATA: TUN, ICAO: DTTA) is the international airport of Tunis, the capital of Tunisia. It serves as the home base for Tunisair, Tunisair Express, Nouvelair Tunisia, and Tunisavia. The airport is named for the historic city of Carthage, located just east of the airport.

== History ==
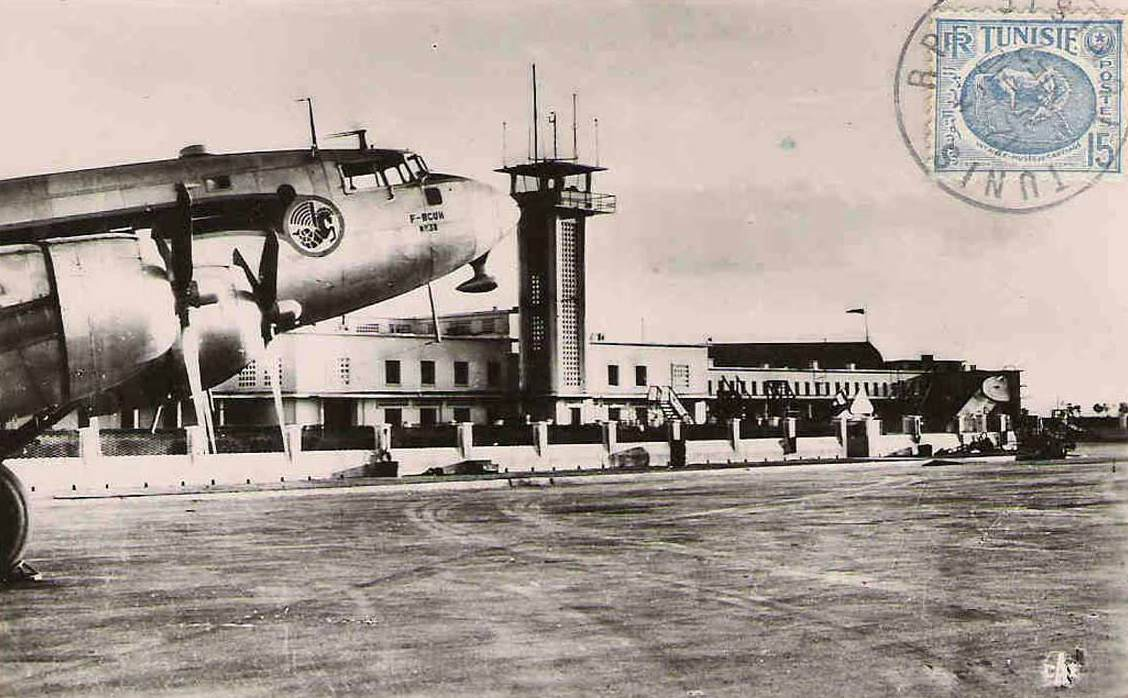
Tunis Airport in 1952.

The history of the airport dates back to 1920 when the first seaplane base in Tunisia was built on the Lake of Tunis for the seaplanes of Compagnie Aéronavale. The Tunis Airfield opened in 1938, serving around 5,800 passengers annually on the Paris-Tunis route.

During World War II, the airport was used by the United States Air Force Twelfth Air Force as a headquarters and command control base for the Italian Campaign of 1943. The following known units were assigned:

- HQ, 87th Fighter Group, 22 November – 14 December 1943
- 3d Reconnaissance Group, 13 June – 8 December 1943, Lockheed F-4/F-5 Lightning
- 5th Reconnaissance Group, 8 September – 8 December 1943, Lockheed F-4/F-5 Lightning

Once the combat units moved to Italy, Air Transport Command used the airport as a major transshipment hub for cargo, transiting aircraft and personnel. It functioned as a stopover en route to Algiers airport or to Mellaha Field near Tripoli, Libya on the North African Cairo-Dakar transport route. Later, as the Allied forces advanced, it also flew personnel and cargo to Naples, Italy.

Construction on the Tunis-Carthage Airport, which was fully funded by France, began in 1944, and in 1948 the airport become the main hub for Tunisair. The airline started operations with Douglas DC-3s flying from Tunis-Carthage Airport to Marseille, Ajaccio, Bastia, Algiers, Rome, Sfax, Djerba, and Tripoli, Libya. The passenger traffic grew steadily from 1951 when 56,400 passengers were carried, 33,400 of them by Air France. The airport offered a convenient stop-over point for several other French airlines over the years, including Aigle Azur with a stop in Tunis on the Paris-Brazzaville route, and TAI (Intercontinental Air Transport) with a stop in Tunis on its Paris-Saigon route. Among foreign companies, the TWA was present, whose lines Rome-New York and Rome-Bombay made stop in Tunis, and the LAI (Italian company) which made the connection Rome-Palermo-Tunis.

In 1997, the airport terminal was expanded to 57,448 m^{2} (618,365 sq ft); it consists of two floors (departure and arrival) and has a capacity of 4,400,000 passengers per year. In 2005, the terminal was expanded another 5,500 m^{2} (59,202 sq ft), and now has a capacity of 500,000 more passengers annually. On 23 September 2006 a new terminal opened for charter flights. Syphax Airlines commenced a direct flight to Montreal in April 2014.

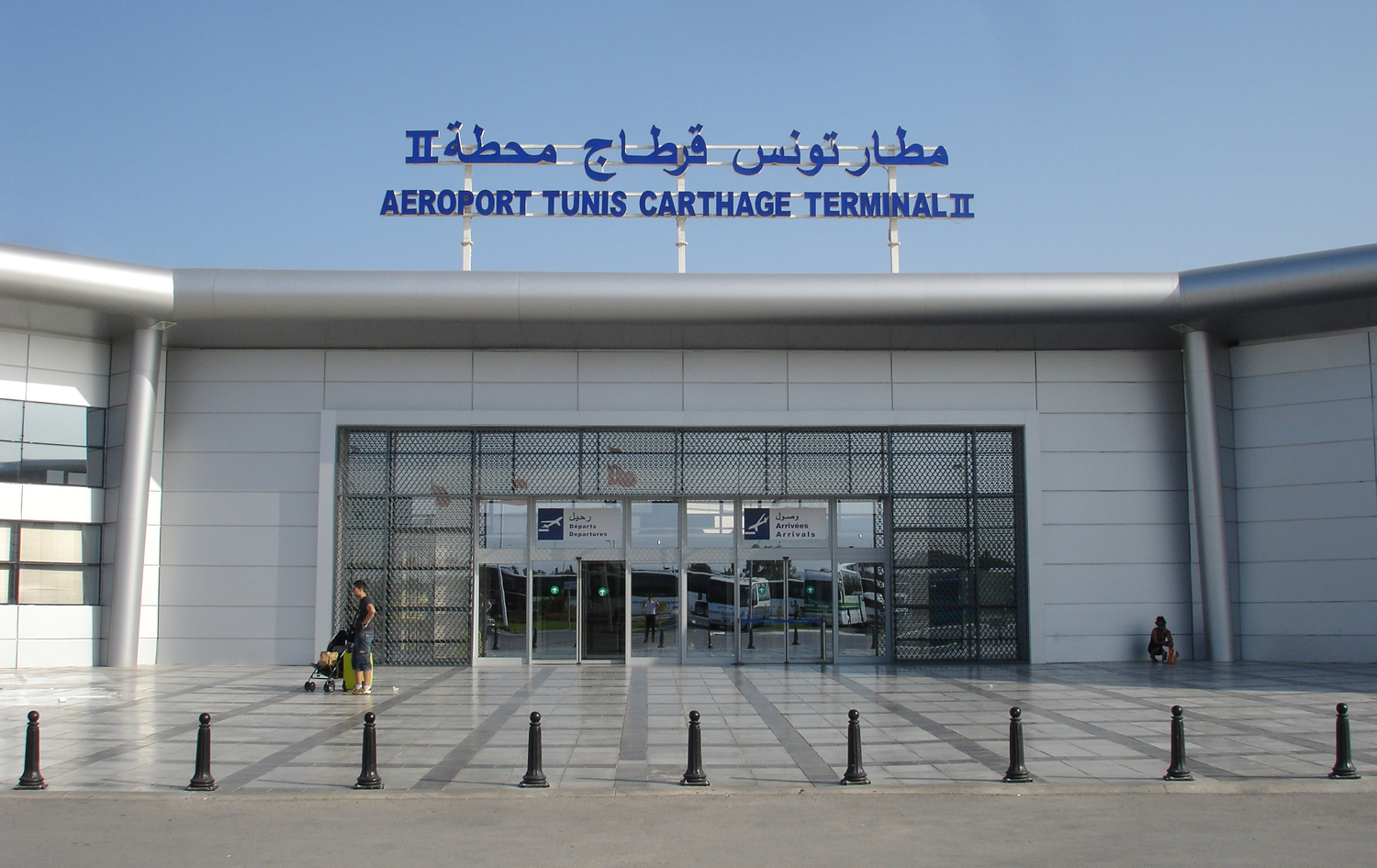
Terminal 2 exterior

== Airlines and destinations ==
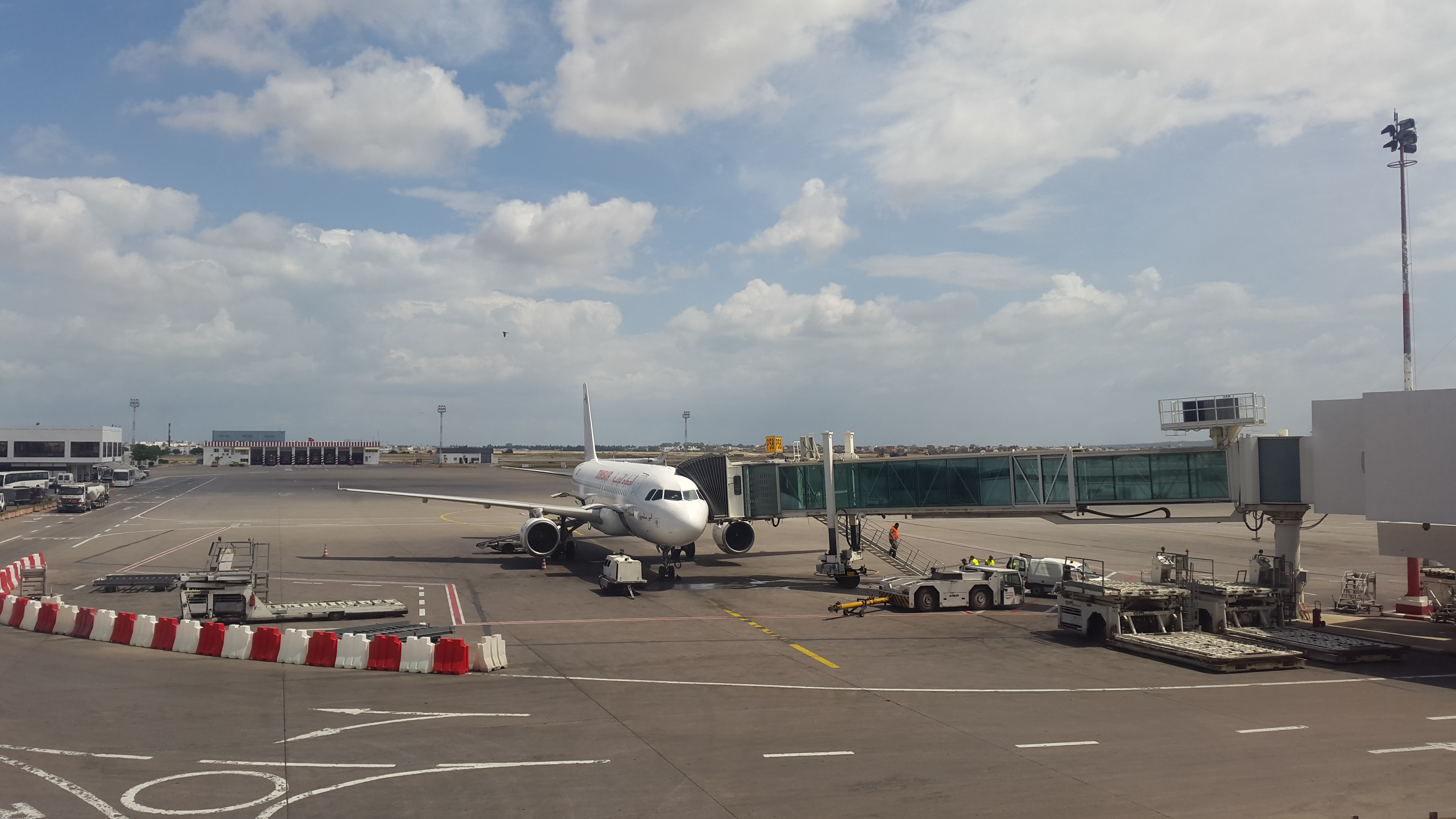
Tarmac view

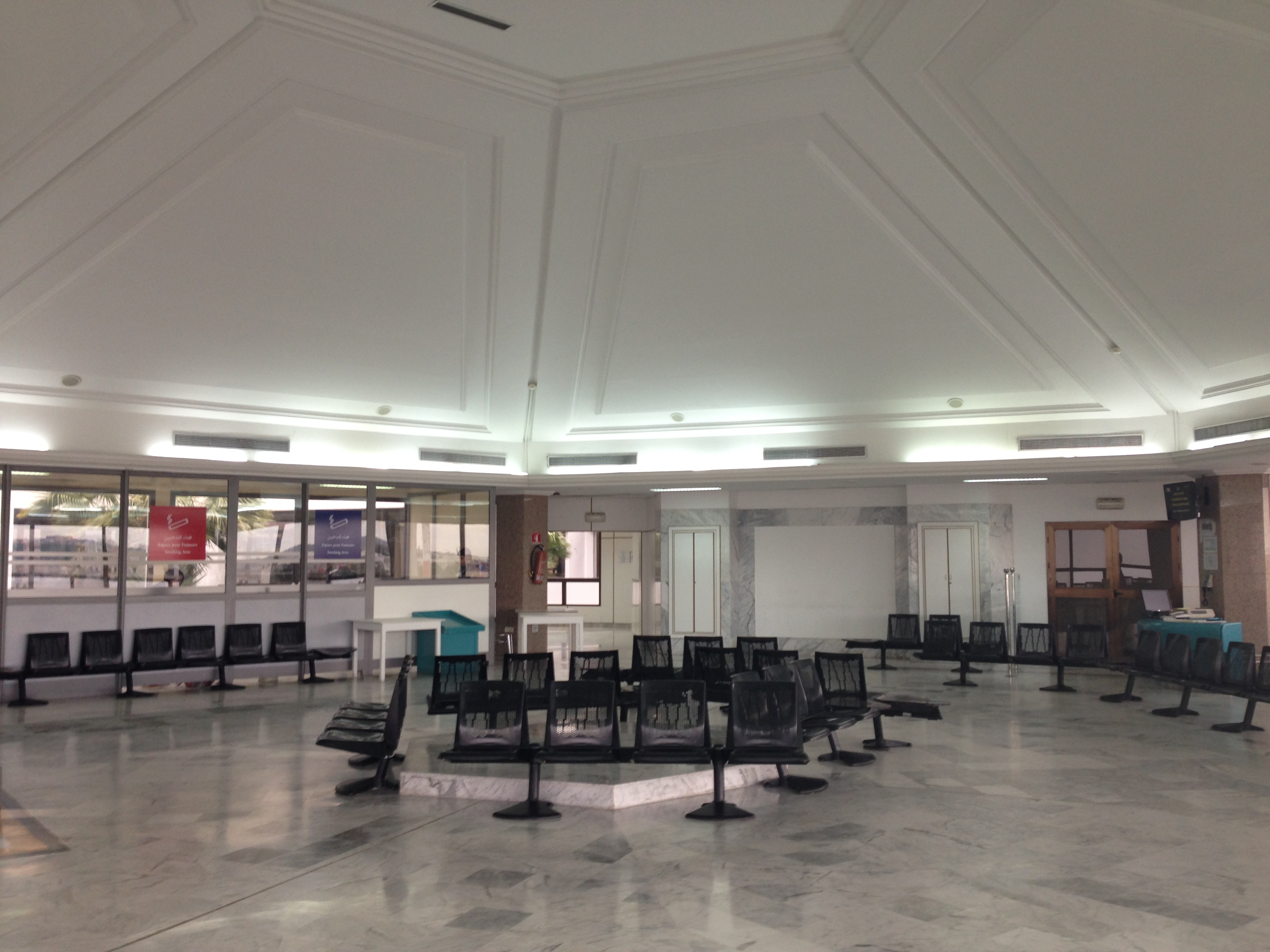
Departure gate area

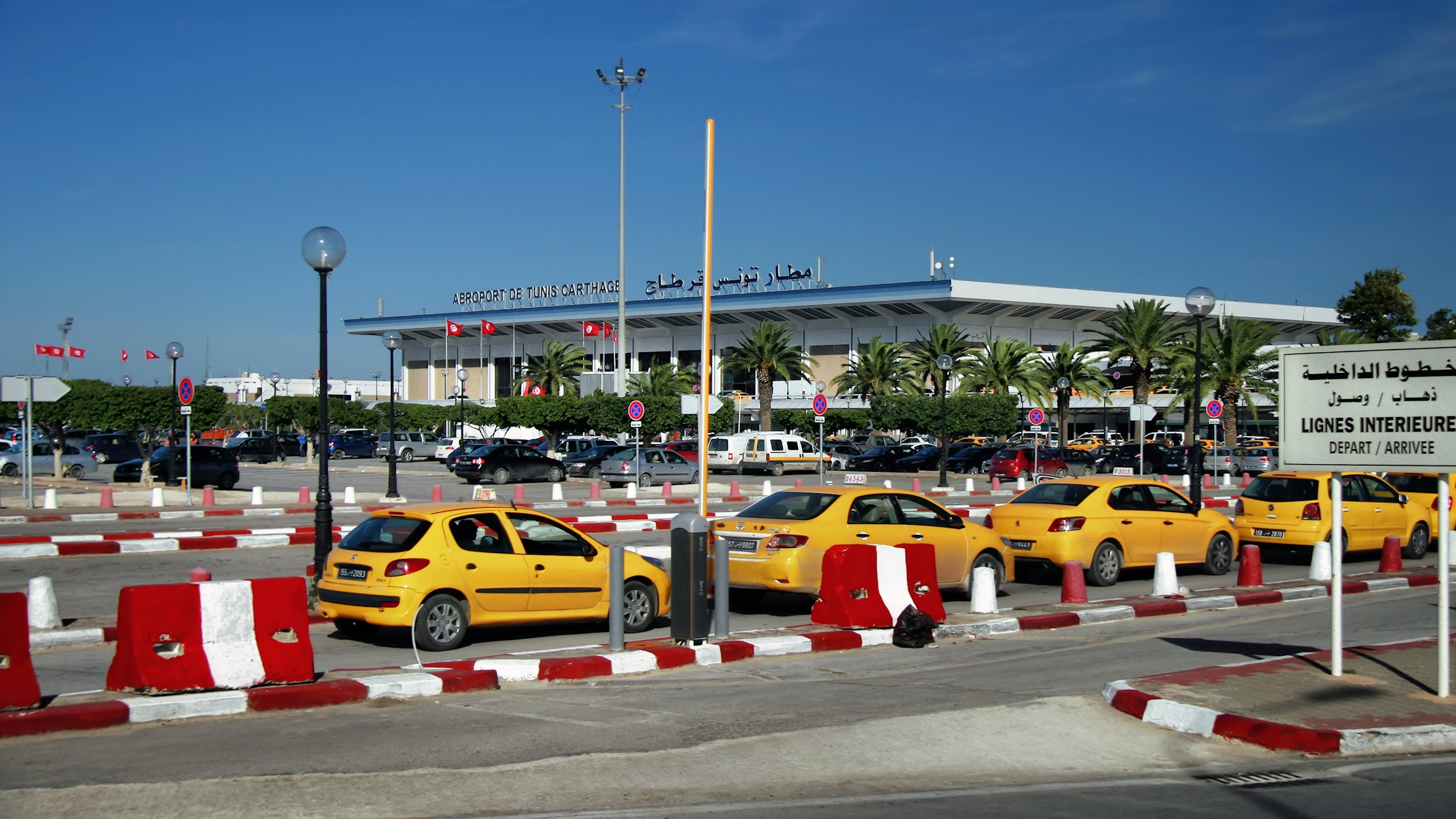
Terminal from the outside

=== Passenger ===
| Airlines | Destinations |
|---|---|
| Aegean Airlines | Athens |
| Afriqiyah Airways | Misrata |
| Air Algérie | Algiers |
| Air Europa | Seasonal: Madrid |
| Air France | Paris–Charles de Gaulle |
| Berniq Airways | Benghazi |
| Buraq Air | Tripoli–Mitiga |
| Egyptair | Cairo |
| Emirates | Dubai–International |
| Etihad Airways | Abu Dhabi |
| Eurowings | Düsseldorf; Seasonal: Stuttgart |
| Ghadames Air Transport | Tripoli–Mitiga |
| Iraqi Airways | Baghdad |
| ITA Airways | Rome–Fiumicino |
| Libyan Airlines | Misrata, Tripoli–Mitiga |
| Libyan Wings | Tripoli–Mitiga |
| Lufthansa | Frankfurt |
| Luxair | Seasonal: Luxembourg |
| Mauritania Airlines | Nouakchott |
| Nouvelair | Algiers, Barcelona, Basel/Mulhouse, Berlin, Bologna, Bordeaux, Brussels, Düsseldorf, Frankfurt, Geneva, Istanbul, Lille, London–Gatwick, Lyon, Marseille, Milan–Malpensa, Munich, Nantes, Nice, Oran, Rabat, Paris–Charles de Gaulle, Strasbourg, Toulouse |
| Qatar Airways | Doha |
| Royal Air Maroc | Casablanca |
| Royal Jordanian | Amman–Queen Alia |
| Transavia | Lyon, Marseille, Montpellier, Nantes, Nice, Paris–Orly |
| Tunisair | Abidjan, Algiers, Bamako, Bologna, Bordeaux, Brussels, Cairo, Casablanca, Conakry, Dakar–Diass, Düsseldorf, Frankfurt, Geneva, Istanbul, Lisbon, London–Gatwick, London–Heathrow, Lyon, Madrid, Marseille, Milan–Malpensa, Montréal–Trudeau, Munich, Niamey, Nice, Nouakchott, Oran, Ouagadougou, Paris–Orly, Rome–Fiumicino, Strasbourg, Toulouse, Tripoli–Mitiga, Venice |
| Tunisair Express | Djerba, Malta, Naples, Palermo, Tozeur |
| Turkish Airlines | Istanbul |
| Vueling | Seasonal: Barcelona |

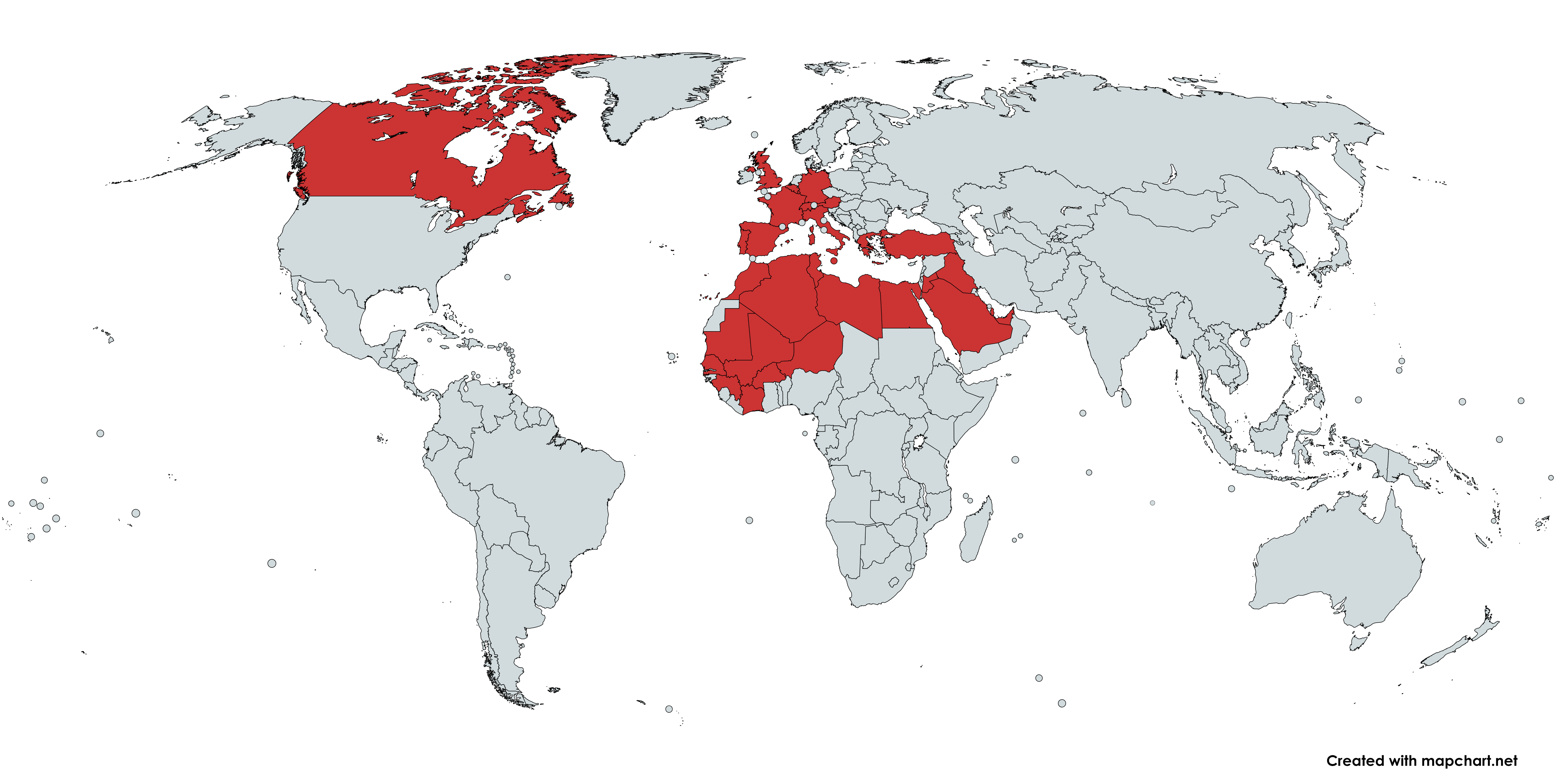
Tunis–Carthage International Airport passenger destinations

=== Cargo ===
| Airlines | Destinations |
|---|---|
| Emirates SkyCargo | Dubai–Al Maktoum |
| Express Air Cargo | Bengaluru, Casablanca, Cologne/Bonn, Hong Kong, Paris–Charles de Gaulle, Sharjah |
| Turkish Cargo | Istanbul |

== Other facilities ==
The head office of the Tunisian Civil Aviation and Airports Authority (OACA) is on the airport property.

== Accidents and incidents ==
On 7 May 2002, EgyptAir Flight 843, a Boeing 737 from Cairo crashed 4 miles from Tunis–Carthage International Airport. Of the 62 people on board, 14 were killed.

== See also ==
- List of the busiest airports in Africa by passenger traffic
- List of airports in Tunisia
