= Gare Habib Bourguiba Monastir =

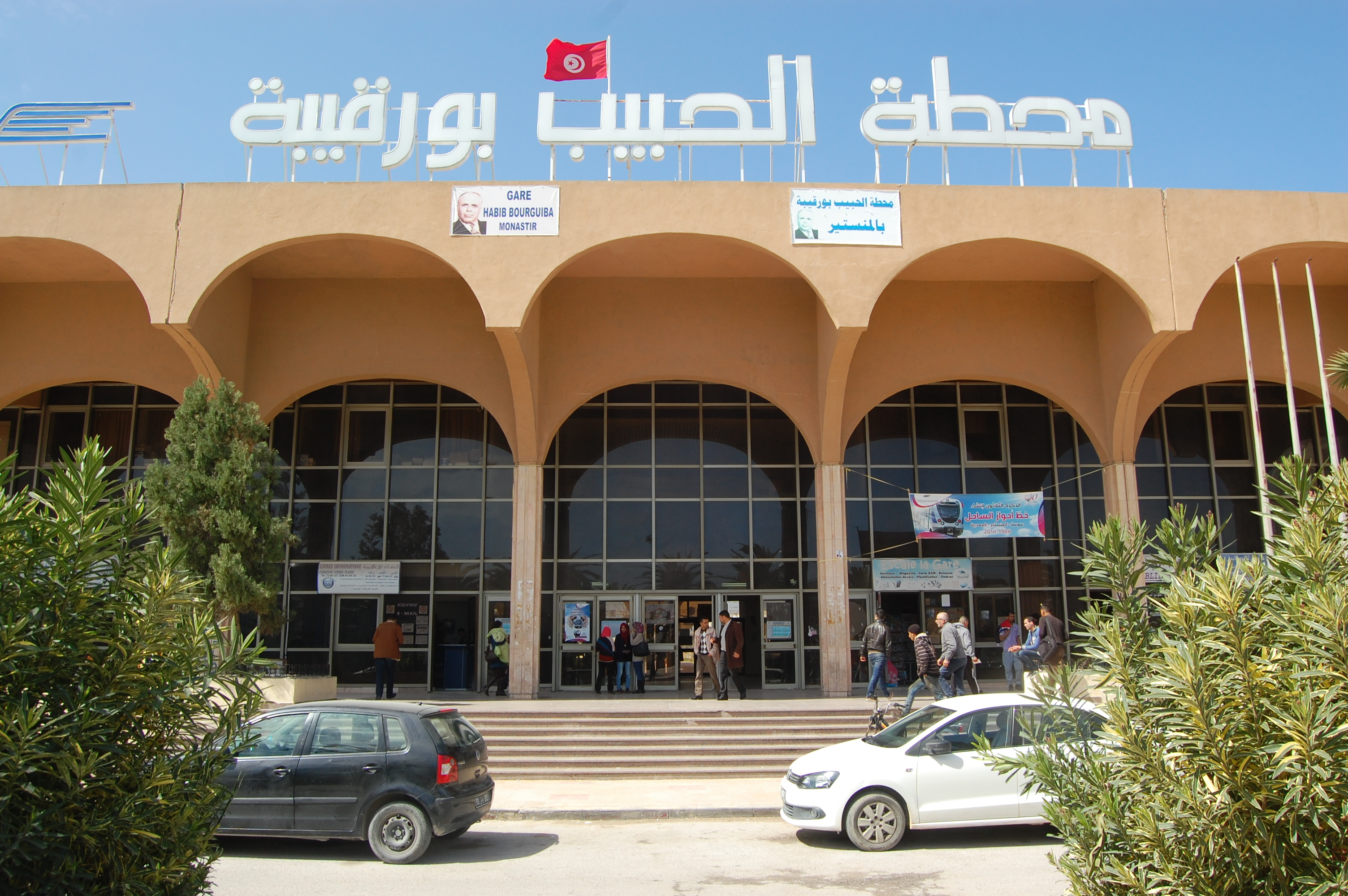
- The station in April 2015

General information
- Location: Monastir; Tunisia
- Coordinates: 35.77089°N 10.8264°E
- System: Terminus
- Operator: Société Nationale des Chemins de Fer Tunisiens
- Platforms: 4

Construction
- Platform levels: 1

History
- Opened: 25 August 1984
Location

Gare Habib Bourguiba Monastir is the main railway station in Monastir, Tunisia. It is operated by the Société Nationale des Chemins de Fer Tunisiens and named for the first Tunisia president Habib Bourguiba. It was inaugurated by President Habib Bourguiba on 25 August 1984.

Trains from the station run on the electrified, metre-gauge Sahel Railway line and serve Mahdia to the south, or Sousse, via Monastir Habib Bourguiba International Airport, to the north. Trains in both directions pass through the adjacent Faculté Monastir, a triangular junction station. Other trains serve Tunis.
