= Djerba–Zarzis International Airport =

Djerba–Zarzis International Airport Aéroport international de Djerba-Zarzis
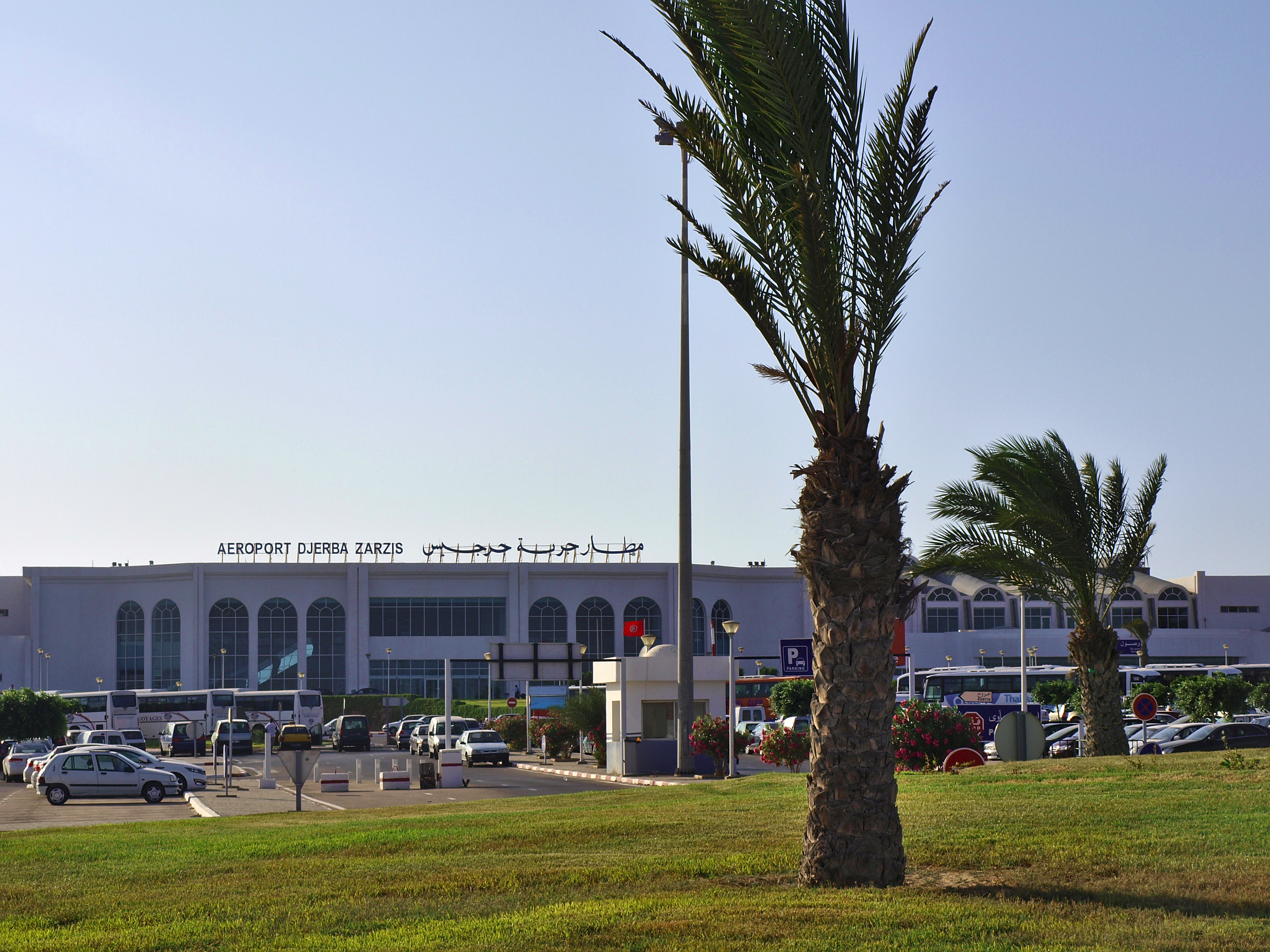
- IATA: DJE; ICAO: DTTJ

Summary
- Airport type: Public
- Operator: Tunisian Civil Aviation & Airports Authority
- Location: Mellita, Djerba, Tunisia
- Elevation AMSL: 19 ft (5.8 m)
- Coordinates: 33°52′30″N 10°46′31″E
- Website: https://www.djerbaairport.net/

Map
- Location of airport in Tunisia

Runways
Direction	Length		Surface
Direction	m	ft	Surface
09/27	3,100	10,171	Asphalt

Statistics (2006, 2024)
- Passengers (2024): 2,203,957
- Aircraft movements (2006): 24,392
- Aircraft freight (2006): 90 tonnes
- Source:, DAFIF

Djerba–Zarzis International Airport (French: Aéroport international de Djerba-Zarzis, Arabic: مطار جربة جرجيس الدولي) (IATA: DJE, ICAO: DTTJ) is an international airport serving the island of Djerba in Tunisia. The airport was enlarged and named Djerba Zarzis International Airport in 1970. However, the airport dates to 1950 (initially named Djerba Mellita airport). Today, it is an important destination for seasonal leisure flights.

== Airlines and destinations ==
The following airlines operate regular scheduled and charter flights at Djerba–Zarzis Airport:

Airlines	Destinations
BH Air	Seasonal charter: Sofia
Brussels Airlines	Seasonal: Brussels
Discover Airlines	Seasonal: Frankfurt, Munich
easyJet	Seasonal: Basel/Mulhouse, London–Luton, Manchester
Edelweiss Air	Seasonal: Zurich
Helvetic Airways	Seasonal: Bern
Luxair	Luxembourg
Nouvelair	Brussels, Lille, Lyon, Marseille, Nantes, Paris–Charles de Gaulle, Toulouse; Seasonal: Basel/Mulhouse, Berlin, Bordeaux, Frankfurt, Hannover, Leipzig/Halle, Nice, Stuttgart, Vienna; Seasonal charter: Belgrade, Ljubljana, Sarajevo
Smartwings	Seasonal charter: Bratislava, Brno, Prague
Swiss International Air Lines	Seasonal: Geneva
Transavia	Lyon, Paris–Orly; Seasonal: Marseille, Montpellier, Nantes
TUI fly Belgium	Brussels
TUI fly Deutschland	Seasonal: Stuttgart
TUI fly Netherlands	Seasonal: Amsterdam
Tunisair	Frankfurt, Lyon, Marseille, Munich, Nice, Paris–Orly
Tunisair Express	Tunis

== Accidents and incidents ==
- On 6 August 2005, Tuninter Flight 1153, a Tuninter ATR-72 en route from Bari to Djerba, Tunisia, ditched into the Mediterranean Sea about 18 miles from the city of Palermo. 16 of the 39 people on board died. The accident resulted from engine fuel starvation that resulted from the installation of the wrong fuel quantity indicator. The fuel quantity indicator installed had been calibrated for the smaller ATR-42 aircraft and showed significantly more fuel than was actually in the tank of the larger ATR 72. When the aircraft ran out of fuel, the indicator still showed 1800 kilograms of fuel remaining, thus confusing the crew for several minutes. Both engines stopped and the crew was forced to ditch the airliner in the sea.
- In 2010, the airport was a stopover for Air Berlin chartered flight AB7377, which was involved in a bomb scare. During loading at Hosea Kutako International Airport in Namibia, a suitcase was discovered that contained a clock, batteries and a firing mechanism. Upon closer inspection, it was discovered that the object was part of a test to assess the quality of airport screening procedures. The A330-200 aircraft was examined with an explosives sniffer dog, before it was allowed to fly to Munich Airport, via a stopover in Djerba.
