= Tozeur–Nefta International Airport =

Airport in Tunisia

Tozeur–Nefta International Airport مطار توزر نفطة الدولي
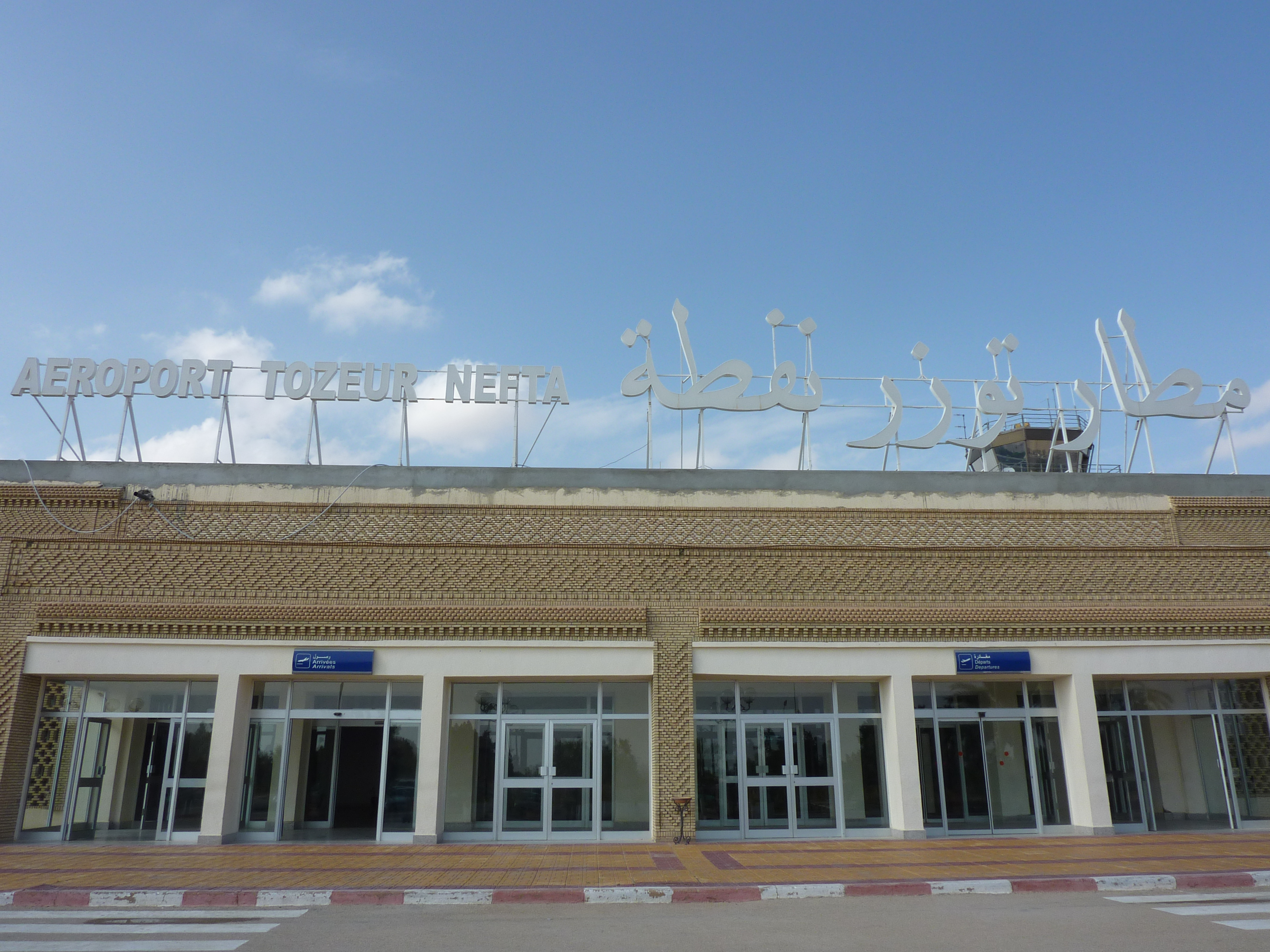
- IATA: TOE; ICAO: DTTZ

Summary
- Airport type: Public
- Operator: Tunisian Civil Aviation & Airports Authority
- Serves: Nefta, Tunisia
- Elevation AMSL: 287 ft / 87 m
- Coordinates: 33°56′23″N 08°06′38″E
- Website: https://www.oaca.nat.tn/web/aeroport-tozeur

Map
- Location of airport in Tunisia

Runways
Direction	Length		Surface
Direction	m	ft	Surface
09/27	3,167	10,581	Asphalt
- Source: DAFIF

Tozeur–Nefta International Airport (French: Aéroport International de Tozeur–Nefta, Arabic: مطار توزر نفطة الدولي, IATA: TOE, ICAO: DTTZ) is an airport serving Tozeur in Tunisia.

== Airlines and destinations ==
The following airlines operate regular scheduled and charter flights at Tozeur–Nefta Airport:

Airlines	Destinations
Transavia	Paris–Orly
Tunisair Express	Tunis

== Accidents and incidents ==
On 27 May 2023, a Flight Design CTSW (67BQF) and a gyroplane collided mid-air; both occupants of 67BQF survived with injuries. The gyroplane crashed and burned; both occupants were killed. The two aircraft were participating in the 34th Rassemblement Aerien International de Tunisie (RAIT) ralleye.
