= Soliman Airstrip =

Airstrip in Tunisia

Soliman Airstrip Sulayman, Solymar
- IATA: none; ICAO: none

Summary
- Airport type: Public
- Serves: Soliman
- Elevation AMSL: 10 ft / 3 m
- Coordinates: 36°42′30″N 10°26′55″E

Map
- Location of the airport in Tunisia

Runways
Direction	Length		Surface
Direction	ft	m	Surface
16/34	2,200	670	Dirt
- Source: Google Maps

Soliman Airstrip is an airstrip serving Soliman in Tunisia.

== See also ==
- Transport in Tunisia
