= Gafsa – Ksar International Airport =

Airport in Tunisia

Gafsa - Ksar International Airport Aéroport international de Gafsa-Ksar
- IATA: GAF; ICAO: DTTF

Summary
- Airport type: Public / Military
- Operator: Tunisian Civil Aviation & Airports Authority
- Serves: Gafsa, Tunisia
- Elevation AMSL: 1,060 ft / 323 m
- Coordinates: 34°25′19″N 08°49′21″E
- Website: https://www.oaca.nat.tn/web/aeroport-gafsa

Map
- Location of airport in Tunisia

Runways
Direction	Length		Surface
Direction	m	ft	Surface
05/23	2,900	9,514	Asphalt
- Source: DAFIF

Gafsa – Ksar International Airport (French: Aéroport international de Gafsa-Ksar, Tunisian Arabic: مطار قفصة قصر الدولي) (IATA: GAF, ICAO: DTTF) is a public sector airport serving Gafsa in Tunisia.

== Airlines and destinations ==
As of 2026, the airport has no regular passenger flights.
