= Tabarka–Aïn Draham International Airport =

Airport in Tunisia

Tabarka–Aïn Draham International Airport Aéroport international de Tabarka–Aïn Draham
- IATA: TBJ; ICAO: DTKA

Summary
- Airport type: Public
- Operator: Tunisian Civil Aviation & Airports Authority
- Serves: Tabarka, Tunisia
- Elevation AMSL: 230 ft / 70 m
- Coordinates: 36°58′48″N 08°52′37″E
- Website: https://www.oaca.nat.tn/web/aeroport-tabarka

Map
- Location of airport in Tunisia

Runways
Direction	Length		Surface
Direction	m	ft	Surface
09/27	2,870	9,416	Asphalt
- Source: DAFIF

Tabarka–Aïn Draham International Airport (French: Aéroport international de Tabarka–Aïn Draham, Tunisian Arabic: مطار طبرقة-عين دراهم الدولي) (IATA: TBJ, ICAO: DTKA), formerly Tabarka–7 November International Airport, is a public sector airport serving Tabarka in Tunisia.

== History ==
Tabarka Airport was built in 1992 to serve the northwest region of Tunisia. Its original name emanated from the November 7, 1987 coup d'etat that ousted Habib Bourguiba, the first President of Tunisia, which was orchestrated by then-Prime Minister Zine el Abidine Ben Ali, who replaced Bourguiba; however, the airport was renamed following the 2011 Revolution that ousted and exiled Ben Ali.

The airport facilitates tourism in the region. However, due to a decline in tourism after the Revolution, the airport experienced a drop in traffic. In 2010, 63,000 passengers transited through Tabarka Airport; in 2011, it received less than 18,000 passengers. On 15 November 2013, rumours of the closure of the airport led to protests by its employees. Passenger numbers further declined in the years leading up to the COVID-19 pandemic.

As of 2026, the airport has no regular passenger flights. During past Hajj seasons, Tunisair used to operate charter flights to Medina.
