= Tunisian Civil Aviation and Airports Authority =

The Tunisian Civil Aviation and Airports Authority (French: Office de l'aviation civile et des aéroports) (OACA) is a Tunisian public sector organization responsible for the management, operation, maintenance and development of international airports, as well as regional and local control of air navigation and its services in Tunisia.

== Brief history ==
In 1940, the first airport in Tunisia started to operate in El Aouina. Still in its aviation infancy, the French controlled all aspects of Tunisian airports and flight.

In 1970, the Office of Tunisian Airports (OPAT) was established and the airport in Almonastir Skanes became the first to be run by Tunisians. OPAT was the first official version of what eventually became the Tunisian Aviation and Airports Authority.

OPAT continued until 1998 when it became the Tunisian Civil Aviation and Airports Authority (OACA).

=== Nature of the company and types of activities ===
Tunisian Civil Aviation and Airports Authority (OACA) is an organization that belongs to the Tunisian public sector. It is "responsible for the management, development, operation, maintenance [...] of international airports, as well as regional and local control of air navigation and its services in Tunisia". Its auspices includes the seven international airports: Tunis–Carthage International Airport, Djerba–Zarzis International Airport, Tozeur–Nefta International Airport, Sfax–Thyna International Airport, Tabarka–Ain Draham International Airport, Gafsa – Ksar International Airport, and Gabès – Matmata International Airport.

=== Company structure ===
==== Main offices ====
The company is composed of fourteen main offices that contain other sub-offices to reach forty offices as a whole. Each office with its sub-offices has a unique function in the company. For example, the Communication and Public Relations Department, Regulation and Quality Department, and Studies and Projects Department. The main offices cannot achieve their work without the collaboration of the sub-offices, such as for the Communication and Public Relations Department: Six divisions are in charge of making a team work.

==== Management ====
OACA is headed by M. Mohammed Rjab who represents the company to the governing Ministry of Transport.
