= Sfax–Thyna International Airport =

Airport in Tunisia

Sfax–Thyna International Airport Aéroport International de Sfax–Thyna
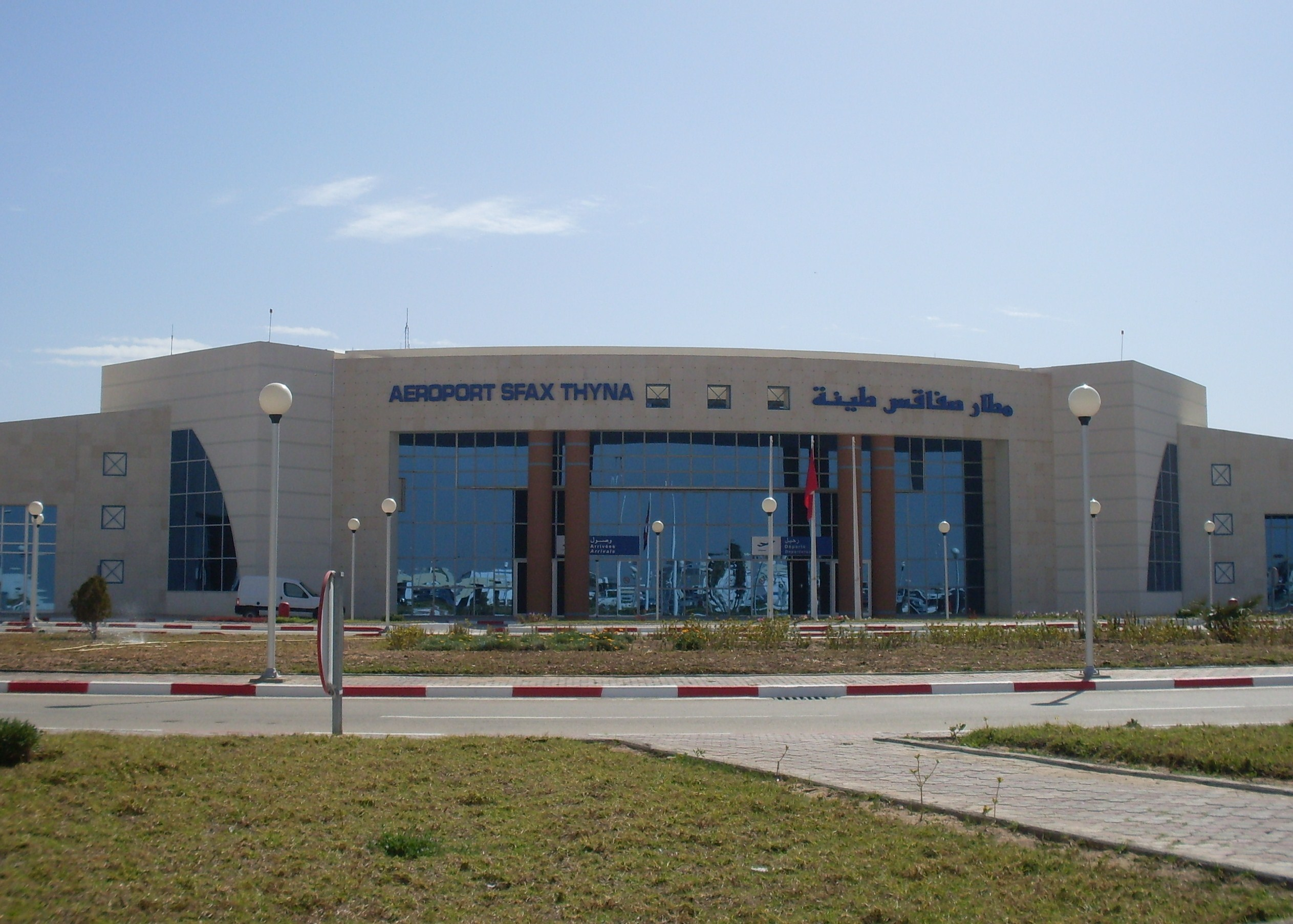
- IATA: SFA; ICAO: DTTX

Summary
- Airport type: Public
- Operator: Tunisian Civil Aviation & Airports Authority
- Serves: Sfax, Tunisia
- Elevation AMSL: 85 ft / 26 m
- Coordinates: 34°43′04″N 010°41′27″E
- Website: https://www.oaca.nat.tn/fr/web/aeroport-sfax

Map
- Location of airport in Tunisia

Runways
Direction	Length		Surface
Direction	m	ft	Surface
15/33	3,000	9,843	Concrete
- Source: DAFIF

Sfax–Thyna International Airport (French: Aéroport International de Sfax–Thyna, Arabic: مطار صفاقس الدولي) (IATA: SFA, ICAO: DTTX) is an airport serving Sfax in Tunisia. The airport is located 6 kilometers (4 miles) southwest from Sfax.

== History ==
=== World War II ===
During World War II, the airport was known as Sfax Airfield and was used by the United States Army Air Forces Ninth Air Force during the North African Campaign. The units known to be assigned here were:

- 12th Bombardment Group, 15 April – 2 June 1943, B-25 Mitchell
- 340th Bombardment Group, 15 April – 2 June 1943, B-25 Mitchell

=== Later years ===
The airport has undergone several extensions and improvements. The most important development and remodeling of the terminal took place in 1988 when the runway was extended. In 1989, a cargo terminal was added and in 1996 new facilities built: warehouse, taxiways and the airport apron were reconstructed. Additionally the runway was improved and a new control tower built.

With a capacity of 200,000 passengers per year, the current terminal covers 2,000 m^{2} (½ acre). A new terminal building covers 8,000 m^{2} (2 acres), consisting of three buildings. Construction started on 8 November 2005, and it was inaugurated on 22 December 2007. With a total cost of six million dinars, it has a capacity of 500,000 passengers. A total budget of 25 million dinars was also devoted to the airport to give it a total facelift (control tower, runway and parking).

From 2011 the airport was the main hub and headquarters for Syphax Airlines up until 2015.

== Airlines and destinations ==
The following airlines operate regular scheduled and charter flights at Sfax–Thyna Airport:

Airlines	Destinations
Afriqiyah Airways	Benghazi, Misrata, Tripoli–Mitiga
Libyan Airlines	Misrata, Tripoli–Mitiga
Transavia	Paris–Orly
