= Gabès – Matmata International Airport =

Airport in Tunisia

Gabès - Matmata International Airport Aéroport International de Gabés - Matmata
- IATA: GAE; ICAO: DTTG

Summary
- Airport type: Public
- Operator: Tunisian Civil Aviation & Airports Authority
- Serves: Gabès, Gabès Governorate, Tunisia
- Elevation AMSL: 125 m / 410 ft
- Coordinates: 33°44′03″N 009°55′12″E
- Website: https://www.oaca.nat.tn/web/aeroport-gabes

Map
- Location of the airport in Tunisia

Runways
Direction	Length		Surface
Direction	m	ft	Surface
06/24	2,998	9,836	Asphalt
- Source: DAFIF

Gabès – Matmata International Airport (French: Aéroport International de Gabés - Matmata) (IATA: GAE, ICAO: DTTG) is an airport serving Gabès, the capital of the Gabès Governorate in south-eastern Tunisia.

== Airlines and destinations ==
As of 2026, the airport has no regular passenger flights.
