= Tunisair =

Flag carrier of Tunisia

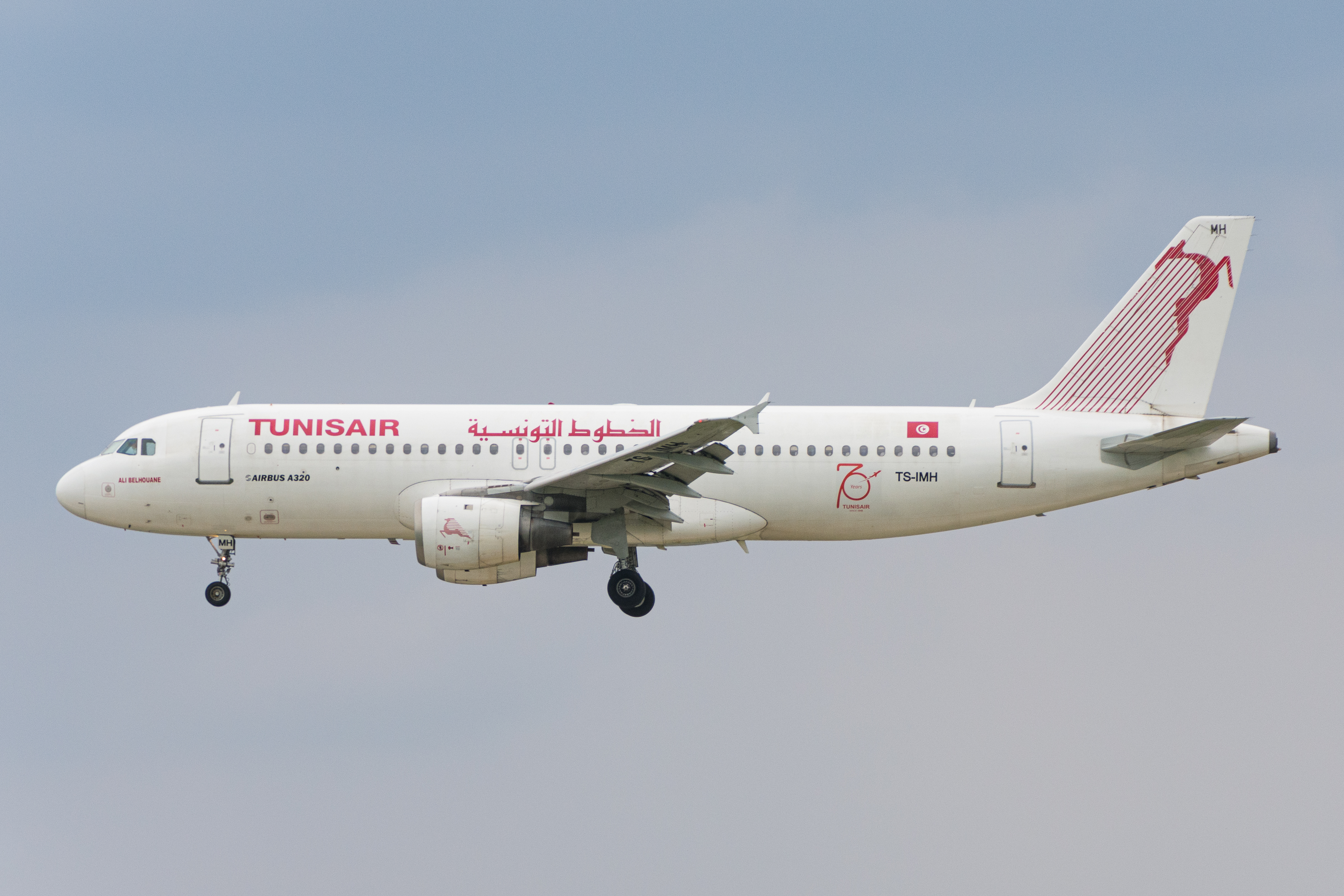
- Tunisair Airbus A320
IATA	ICAO	Call sign
TU	TAR	TUNAIR
- Founded: 1948; 78 years ago
- Commenced operations: 1 April 1949; 77 years ago
- Hubs: Tunis–Carthage International Airport
- Frequent-flyer program: Fidelys
- Fleet size: 30
- Destinations: 44
- Headquarters: Tunis, Tunisia
- Key people: Halima Ibrahim Khouaja (CEO)
- Website: www.tunisair.com

La Société Tunisienne de l'Air, trading as Tunisair (Arabic: الخطوط التونسية), is the national airline of Tunisia. Formed in 1948, it operates scheduled international services to four continents. Its main base is Tunis–Carthage International Airport. The airline's head office is in Tunis, near Tunis Airport.

== History ==
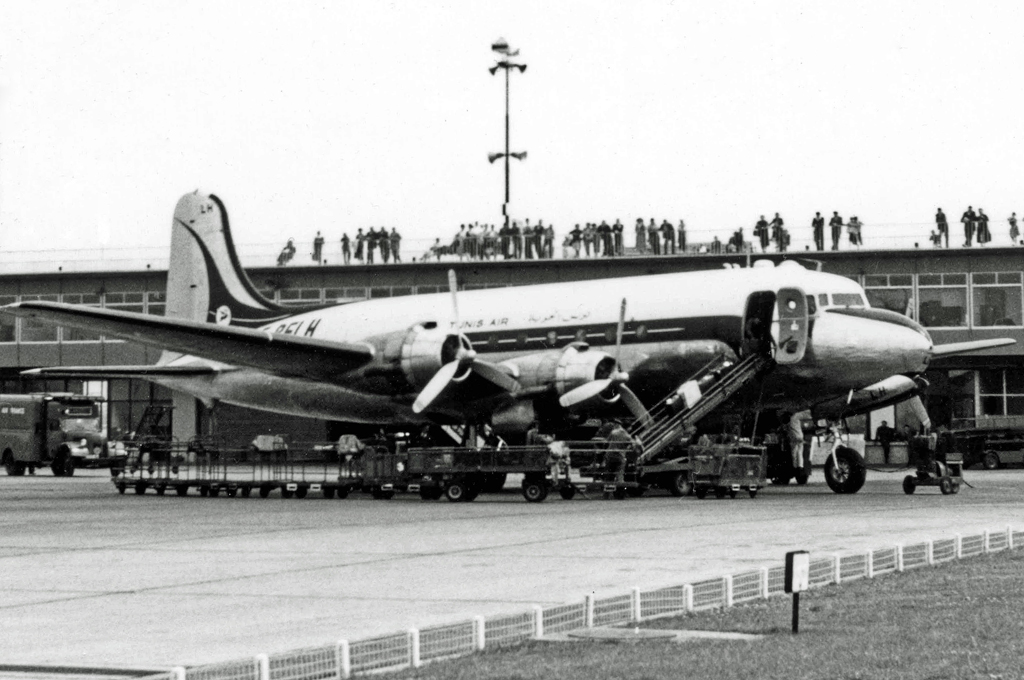
Tunis Air Douglas DC-4 at Paris (Orly) Airport in 1957

The carrier was formed by the government of Tunisia as Société Tunisienne de l'Air in late 1948. The initial investment was FRF 60 million, with shareholding split between the government (35%), Air France (35%) and another interests (30%). Air France transferred some of its DC-3s and routes (which included Tunis–Bone–Algiers, Tunis–Ajaccio–Nice, Tunis–Bastia–Nice, Tunis–Rome and a cargo flight between Tunis and Marseille) to the new airline for it to start operations; these commenced on 1 April 1949. The first managing director of the company was René Lefèvre.

The route network was expanded along the coast during the early 1950s. In 1951, Casablanca, Ghudamis and Tripoli were incorporated as destinations. In May that year, a Tunis–Tripoli–Sabhah service was launched; it was routed via Sfax and Djerba in September. The Ghudamis route was terminated in 1952, and the Casablanca run was taken over by Air France the same year. In 1953, the service to Marseille was extended to Paris. In 1954, a Douglas DC-4 was leased from Air France and used on the route to Paris. At March 1955, the fleet comprised three Douglas DC-3s, one Douglas DC-4 and a SNCASE Languedoc. During 1955, the carrier transported 92,344 passengers. At year end, the number of employees was 140. The airline had a revenue of £620,000 for 1955, and costs totalled to £550,000. In 1957 the Tunisian government became the largest shareholder (51%) and the stake held by Air France was reduced to 15%.

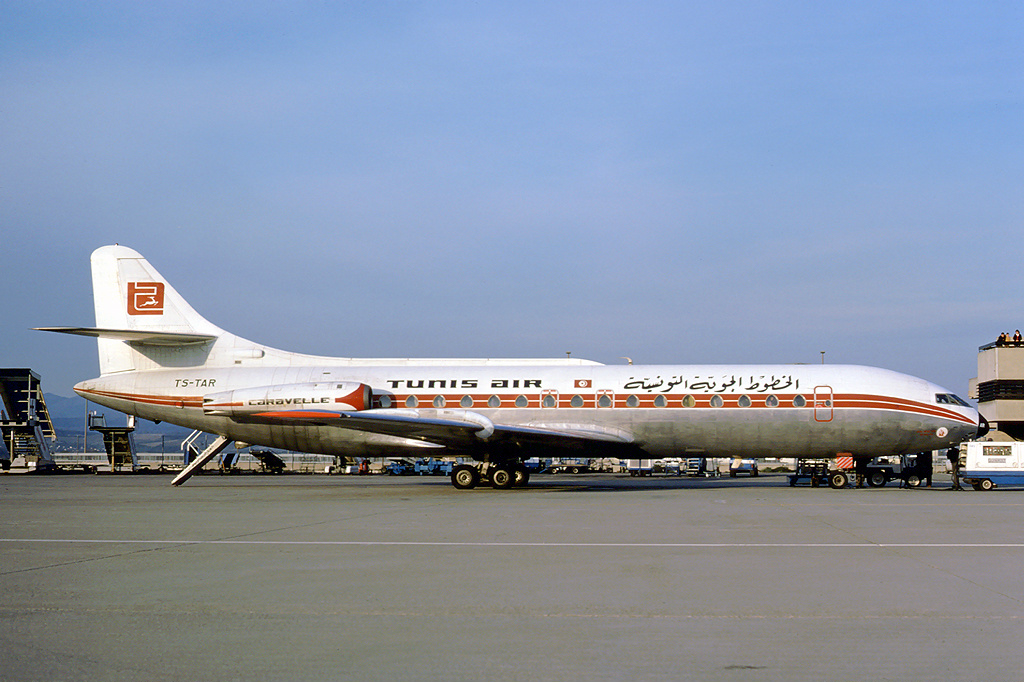
A Tunis Air Caravelle III at Euroairport in 1977. The carrier took delivery of the first aircraft of the type in 1961.

The carrier took delivery of its first jet-powered aircraft, a Sud Caravelle III, on 31 August 1961. A new service to Frankfurt was inaugurated in October but it was terminated in March the following year due to poor economical performance. A second Caravelle was ordered in 1963 and entered service in March 1964. In cooperation with Lufthansa, flights to Frankfurt were restarted in April 1966 using Caravelle equipment. The Nord 262 was first put into service in 1969. The introduction of this aircraft into the fleet along with the airline already having two Caravelles in operation allowed the carrier to phase out a DC-3 and two DC-4s.

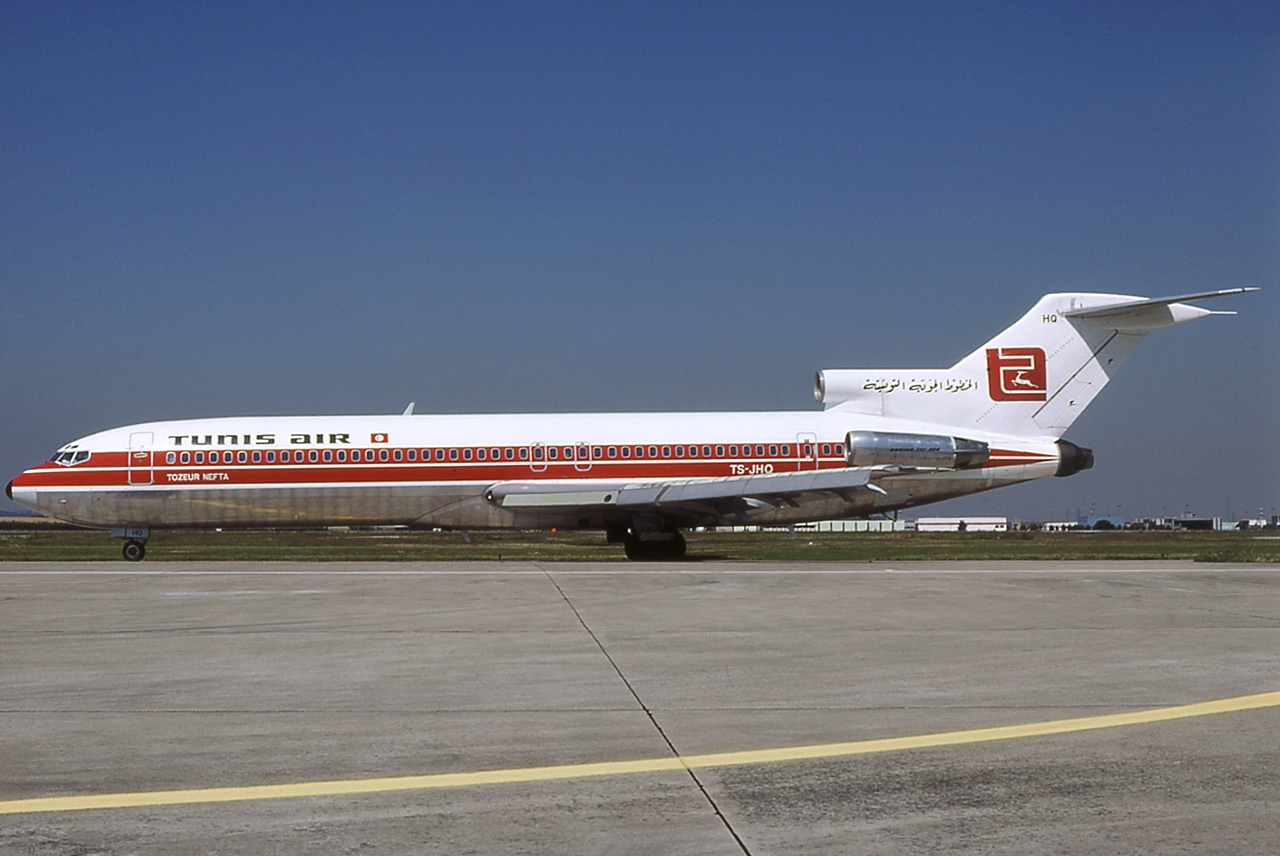
A Boeing 727 formerly operated by Tunisair painted with an older livery.

The number of employees had grown to 888 by March 1970. At this time, they had four Caravelles, two Cessna 402s, a DC-3 and a Nord 262, which were used on domestic services and international routes to Algeria, Belgium, France, Germany, the Netherlands, (Note: ″Holland″ is the name of the country served included in supporting source.) Italy, Libya, Morocco and Switzerland. Tunis Air took delivery of its first Boeing aircraft, a Boeing 727-200, on 12 March 1972; it was put on service on the Tunis–Paris run. On 1 April 1972, a Boeing 707 that was leased from Sabena inaugurated the Tunis–London link. The same day, new services to Luxembourg and Jeddah were launched. Late in the year, a second Boeing 727s was ordered for delivery in July 1973. In 1973, a third Boeing 727 was ordered for handover in December that year. A fourth and fifth 727 were ordered in 1974 and 1975. The gradual incorporation of the Boeing 727s permitted Tunisair to replace the Caravelles and to retire the remaining DC-3s.

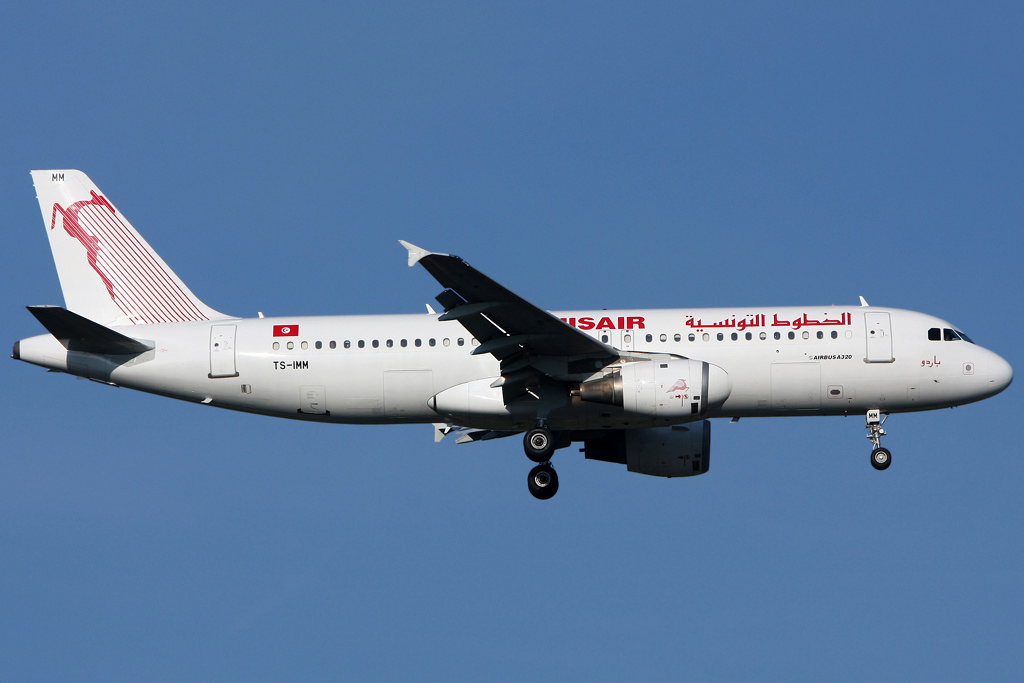
Tunisair Airbus A320-200

For the first time in its history, in 1995 the carrier started trading its shares at the Tunis stock exchange when 20% of the stake was floated. Ahmed Smaoui took over as president and director general of the company in March 1997. In January 1999, Abdelmalek Larif became the new president. Also in 1999, flights to Amman and Beirut were launched. By April 2000 the airline had 7259 employees. At this time the fleet comprised one Airbus A300B4-200, two Airbus A319-100s, ten Airbus A320-200s, four Boeing 727-200 Advanced, three Boeing 737-200 Advanced, four Boeing 737-500s and three Boeing 737-600s that served the following destinations: Abu Dhabi, Algiers, Amman, Amsterdam, Athens, Barcelona, Beirut, Berlin, Bilbao, Bordeaux, Bratislava, Brussels, Budapest, Cairo, Casablanca, Copenhagen, Dakar, Damascus, Djerba, Düsseldorf, Frankfurt, Gafsa, Geneva, Graz, Hamburg, Istanbul, Jeddah, Lille, Linz, Lisbon, London, Luxembourg, Lyon, Madrid, Malta, Marseille, Milan, Monastir, Munich, Nice, Nouakchott, Palermo, Paris, Prague, Rome, Salzburg, Sfax, Stockholm, Strasbourg, Tabarka, Toulouse, Tozeur, Tunis, Vienna, Warsaw and Zurich.

In 2007, Nabil Chettaoui was appointed as chief executive officer (CEO). In June 2011, Hamadi Thamri replaced Chettaoui as president and CEO of the company. In July the same year, Moscow was first served by the carrier with flights to Domodedovo Airport. The airline's first transatlantic service, Tunis–Montreal, was launched in July 2016.

== Corporate affairs ==
=== Ownership and management ===
As of October 2024, Tunisair is owned 64.86% by the Tunisian state, 9.56% by three state-owned national funds (CNSS, CNRPS, CNAM), and 5.58% by Air France. The remaining 20% of the stake is floated under the ticker TAIR. The position of CEO was replaced by a head of general management, and a chairman of the board of directors. Montassar Bnouni and Habib Mekki were appointed respectively. Habib Mekki also holds the position of Secretary General of the Ministry of Transport.

=== Business trends ===
Annual reports for Tunisair do not appear to be regularly published; figures can also appear to be inconsistent in industry and press reports. Figures for the Airline (or the Group) seem to be as shown below (as of year ending 31 December):

	2014	2015	2016	2017	2018	2019	2020	2021	2022	2023	2024	2025
Turnover (TND m)	1,114	857	995	1,280	1,793	1,868	596	733	1,428	1,580	1,635	1,627
Net profit (TND m)			−196.6		−216.5	−209.0	−317.5	−335.0	−220.8			
Number of employees	3,747		3,579	3,765								
Number of passengers (m)	3.5	2.8	3.0	3.5	3.8						2.6	2.5
Passenger load factor (%)	71.8			74.4	74.5				74.5	72.8	73.1	76.1
Number of aircraft (at year end)			29	29	28							
Notes/sources												

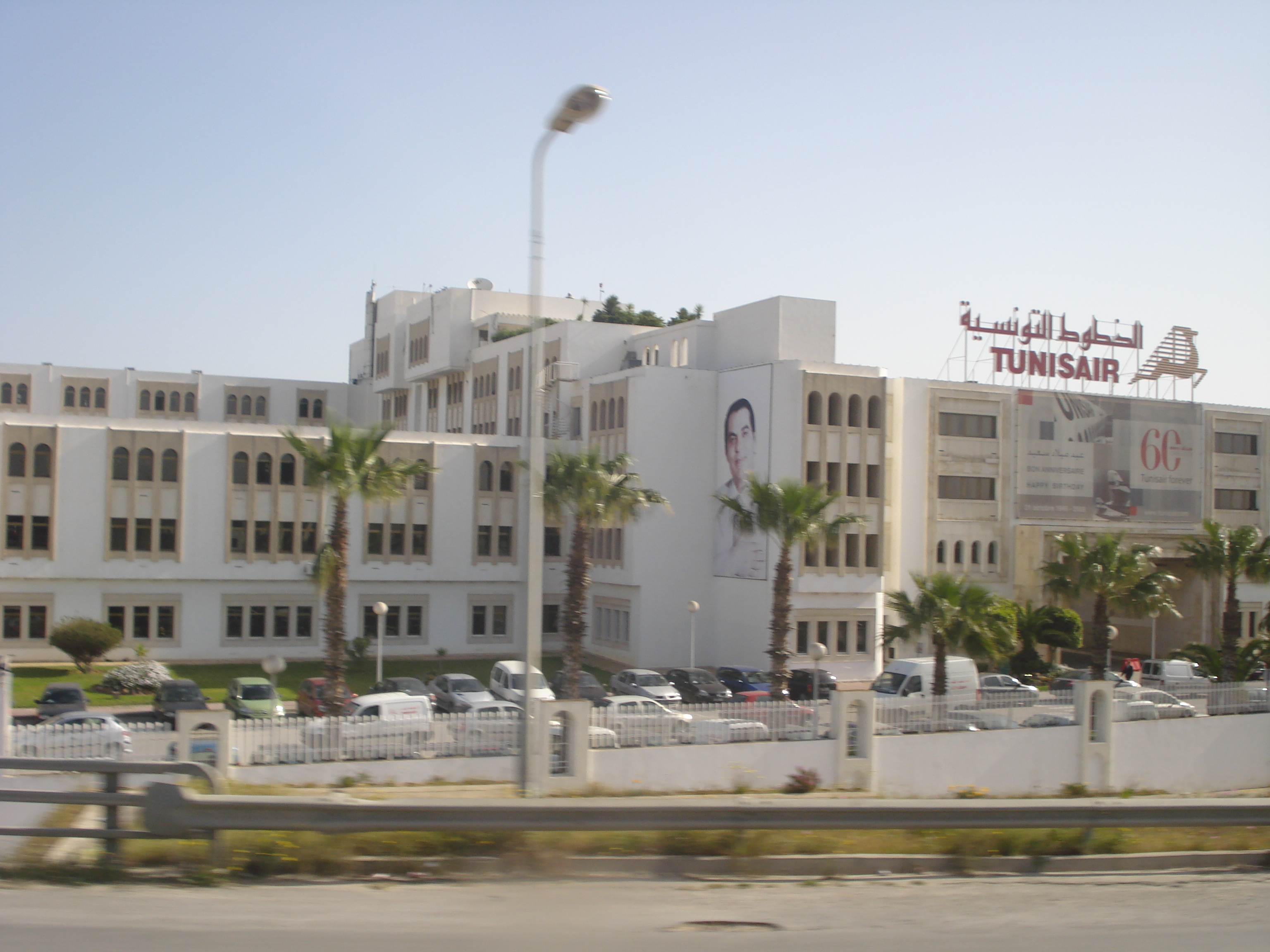
The head office of Tunisair

=== Head office ===
Tunisair's head office is located on Route X near Tunis–Carthage International Airport in Tunis.

== Destinations ==
Tunisair flies to destinations across Africa, Asia, Europe and North America. Its main base is Tunis–Carthage International Airport.

As of November 2023, the airline serves 24 countries on 68 routes.

=== Codeshare agreements ===
Tunisair has Codeshare agreements with the following airlines:

- Emirates
- Middle East Airlines
- Royal Jordanian
- Etihad Airways

=== Interline agreements ===
- Air Canada
- Air Burkina
- Kuwait Airways
- WestJet

== Fleet ==
=== Current fleet ===
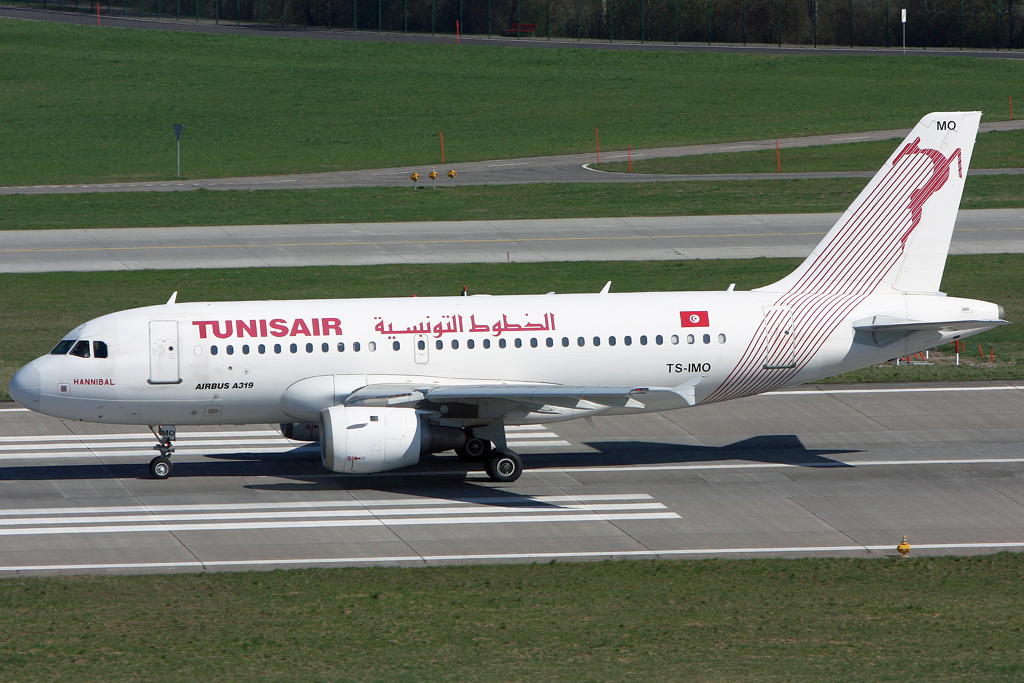
A Tunisair Airbus A319-100 at Zurich Airport in 2011.

The Tunisair fleet consists of the following aircraft, as of May 2025:

Tunisair fleet
Aircraft	In Service	Orders	Passengers			Notes
Aircraft	In Service	Orders	C	Y	Total	Notes
Airbus A319-100	2	—	12	102	114	
Airbus A320-200	11	—	32	114	146	
Airbus A320-200	11	—	—	162	162	
Airbus A320neo	5	—	12	138	150	
Airbus A330-200	2	—	24	242	266	
Total	20	0				

=== Historical fleet ===
- Airbus A300-600
- Boeing 737-500
- Boeing 737-600
- Boeing 747

=== Recent developments ===
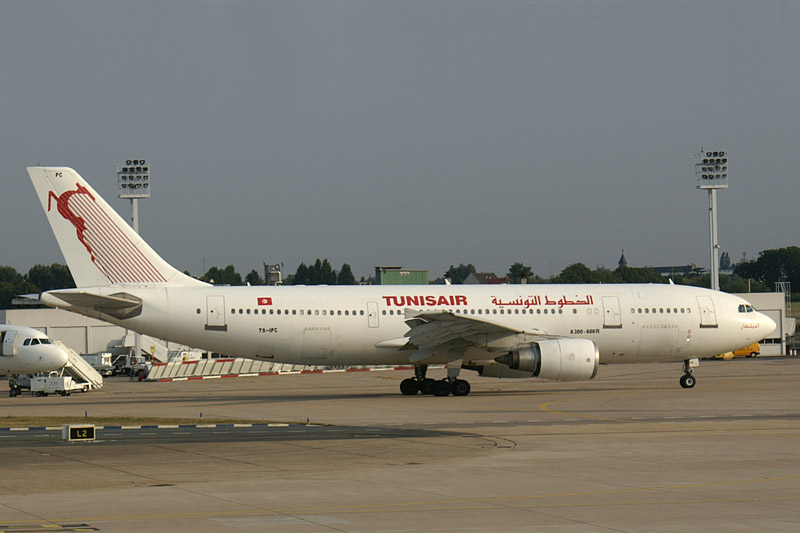
Tunisair Airbus A300-600 at Paris-Orly.

Tunisair became the first Airbus A319 customer in both the Arab World and Africa when it ordered three aircraft in October 1997, along with four Airbus A320s. Another order followed the same year when the carrier acquired four Boeing 737-600s that were initially slated for delivery starting in May 1999. The airline took options on three more aircraft but the specific variants were not informed at that time. The aircraft included in both orders were aimed at replacing the ageing Boeing 727s and 737s in the airline's fleet. The company took delivery of its first A319 in August 1998. Tunisair subsequently added three more Boeing 737-600s, taking delivery of the seventh one in April 2001.

Two second-hand General Electric CF6-powered Airbus A300-600R were purchased in 2000; A third aircraft of the type joined the fleet in 2001. An extended range A319 was ordered in 2006. In July 2008, Tunisair ordered three Airbus A350 XWBs, along with three Airbus A330-200s and ten Airbus A320s. The order was partially amended in mid-2013, when the airline cancelled the order for the A350. The airline took delivery of its first Airbus A330-200 in June 2015. The Airbus order was amended again in 2016, removing an A330 and four A320s and including four Airbus A320neos.

== Incidents and accidents ==
Tunisair has never experienced a fatal accident since its founding in 1948, but has experienced three hull losses:

- On 12 January 1979, a Boeing 727 was hijacked and diverted to Libya after the hijackers demanded the release of Tunisian trade unionist Habib Achour. In Tripoli, the hijackers surrendered. There were no fatalities.
- On 11 February 1992, a Boeing 727 rolled out of its hangar at Tunis–Carthage International Airport during an engine test due to technicians forgetting to set the aircraft's brakes. The aircraft was damaged beyond repair.
- On 6 February 2013, an Airbus A320 operating as Flight 712 excursed from the runway while landing at Tunis–Carthage International Airport. All 83 people on board survived, but the aircraft was declared a hull loss.

== See also ==
- TunisAir Express
- Transport in Tunisia

== Bibliography ==
- Guttery, Ben R. (1998). Encyclopedia of African Airlines. Jefferson, North Carolina: McFarland & Company, Inc. ISBN 0-7864-0495-7.
