= List of defunct airlines of Libya =

This is a list of defunct airlines of Libya.

Airline	Image	IATA	ICAO	Callsign	Commenced operations	Ceased operations	Notes
Aero Libia					1958	1958	
Air Jamahiriya			LJA	AIR JAMAHIRIYA	1999	2001	Established as Light Air Transport. Merged into Libyan Arab Airlines. Operated DHC-6 Twin Otters
Air Kufra		7F	KAV	AIRKUFRA	2008	2010	
Air Libya (All World Aviation)					1977	1980	
Air Libya Tibesti		7Q	TLR	AIR LIBYA	1999	2002	Renamed to Air Libya
Air One Nine Company		N6	ONR	EDER	2004	2013	
Air Tobruk					2005	2006	
AirLibya					1963	1979	
Alajnihah Airways		2T	ANH	ALAJNIHAH	2004	2010	
Alamia Air			LML	ALAMIA AIR	2009	2009	
Aldawlyh Air			IIG		2003	2006	Banned in Belgium
Allebia Air Cargo					2007	2007	Operated Antonov An-72
Allibo Air Cargo			LBO	ALLIBO FREIGHT	?	?	
Alsaqer Aviation			SQR	ALSAQER AVIATION	?	?	
Aqaba Airlines					2003	2004	
Awan Airlines			AWR	AWAN AIR	?	?	
Ghadames Air Transport		OG	GHT		2004	2020	
Gulf Pearl Airlines			GPC	AIR GULFPEARL	2007	2007	
Jamahiriya Air Transport					1982	1993	Established as United African Airlines. Merged into Libyan Air Cargo. Operated Boeing 707, Canadair CL-44, Il-62, Il-76, Il-78
Kallat El Saker Air			KES	KALLAT EL SKER	?	?	
Kardair					1971	1980	Operated Convair 340, Convair 440
Kingdom of Libya Airlines					1965	1969	Renamed to Libyan Arab Airlines
LAVCO (Libyan Aviation Company)					1960	1975	Operated Aero Commander 560, C-45 Expeditor, C-54, Cessna 170, Cessna 180, DC-3, DC-6, de Havilland Dove, DHC-2 Beaver
Libavia					1958	1965	Merged into Kingdom of Libya Airlines. Operated Ilyushin Il-62M
Libiavia					1931	1958	Operated Douglas DC-6
Libo Air Cargo		6W	LBO		2010	2013	Merged into Afriqiyah Airways. Operated Ilyushin Il-76
Libyan Arab Airlines		LN	LAA		1969	1986	Rebranded as Libyan Airlines
Libyan Bluebird			LBB	LIBYAN BLUEBIRD	?	?	
Libyan Express For Air Transport			LXX	LIBYANEXPRESS	?	?	
Libyavia					2007	2007	
Light Air Transport & Technical Service					1992	1999	Renamed to Air Jamahiriya. Operated Antonov An-2, DHC-6 Twin Otters
Linair					1962	1973	Operated Fokker F27, Douglas DC-3, Cessna 310
Motahida Aviation			MOT	MOTAHIDA	?	?	
Nayzak Air Transport		M4	NZA	NAYZAK AIR	2006	2009	
Northafrican Air Transport			NLL	NORTHAFRICAN AIR	?	?	
Qurinea Air Service			QAQ	QURINEA AIR	?	?	
Rahila Air		RI	RIH	RAHILA	2018	2019	Operated Airbus A320-200
Royal Libyan Airlines					1965	1965	Renamed to Kingdom of Libya Airlines. Operated Sud Aviation Caravelle
Sin Sad Airlines					2000	2004	Operated An-26, An-72, An-74, BAC 1-11, Il-62M
Sirte Oil Company					1981	2008	Merged into Petro Air
Tobruk Air		7T	TOB	TOBRUK AIR	2002	2006	
United African Airlines		UQ	NOL		1979	1982	Rebranded as Jamahiriya Air Transport. Operated Douglas DC-8, Ilyushin Il-18, Lockheed L-100
United Libya Airlines					1962	1965	
Veba Oil					1987	2008	Merged into Petro Air
Waha Oil Company					1956	2008	Merged into Petro Air

== See also ==
- List of airlines of Libya
- List of airports in Libya
