= List of airlines of Libya =

This is a list of airlines currently operating in Libya. All airlines are currently on the List of airlines banned in the European Union.

Airline	Image	Airline (in Arabic)	IATA	ICAO	Callsign	Base/hub	Additional Info
Afriqiyah Airways		الخطوط الجوية الأفريقية	8U	AAW	AFRIQIYAH	Tripoli International Airport	
Air Libya		ليبيا للطيران	7Q	TLR	AIR LIBYA	Tripoli International Airport; Benina International Airport	
Berniq Airways		برنيق للطيران	NB	BNL	BERNIQ AIRWAYS	Benina International Airport	
Buraq Air		البراق	UZ	BRQ	BURAQAIR	Tripoli International Airport; Benina International Airport	
Crown Airlines		تاج للطيران	FQ	CWN	CROWN AIRLINES	Mitiga International Airport	
Fly Oya		شركة طيران أويا	YI	OYA	FLY OYA	Mitiga International Airport	
Ghadames Air Transport		غدامس للطيران	NJ	GMS	GHADAMES AIR	Mitiga International Airport	
Global Aviation and Services Group		المجموعة العالمية للطيران و الخدمات	5S	GAK	AVIAGROUP	Tripoli International Airport; Benina International Airport	
Libyan Airlines		الخطوط الجوية الليبية	LN	LAA	LIBAIR	Tripoli International Airport	
Libyan Arab Air Cargo		الليبي للشحن الجوى		LCR	LIBAC	Tripoli International Airport	
Libyan Wings		الاجنحة الليبية	YL	LWA	LIBYAN WINGS	Mitiga International Airport	
Medsky Airways		السماء المتوسط	BM	MNS	MEDSKY	Mitiga International Airport	Two Aircraft operated by Malta MedAir
Petro Air		طيران النفط		PEO	PETRO AIR	Tripoli International Airport	
Fly Diamond Airlines		الماسة للطيران		FDC	Fly Diamond	Mitiga International Airport	Two Airbus-320 , one LET-410 Aircraft
United Aviation (Libya)		المتحدة للطيران				Mitiga International Airport	

== See also ==
- List of defunct airlines of Libya
- List of airlines
- List of air carriers banned in the European Union
