= 1993 Tehran mid-air collision =

Deadly 1993 aviation accident in Tehran, Iran

Accident and Midair collision
- Date: 8 February 1993
- Summary: Mid-air collision caused by ATC error and pilot error on the Su-24
- Site: Shahr-e Qods, Tehran Province, Iran; 35°43′39″N 51°7′35″E
- Total fatalities: 133
- Total survivors: 0

First aircraft
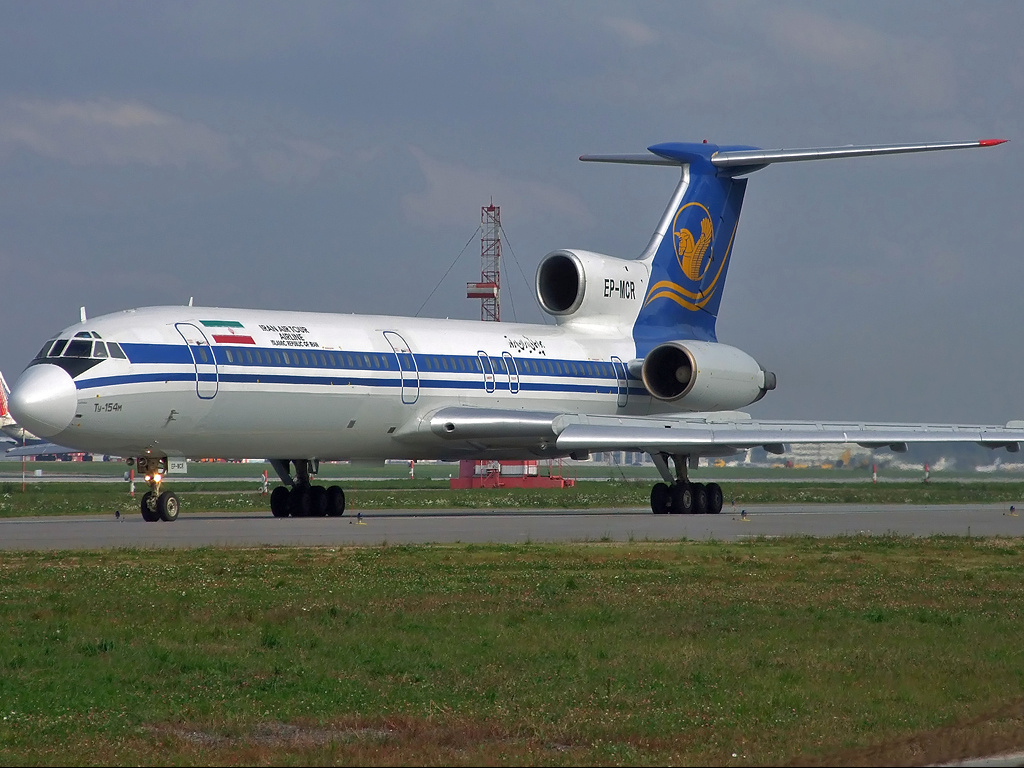
- An Iran Airtour Tu-154M, similar to the one involved in the accident
- Type: Tupolev Tu-154M
- Operator: Iran Airtour
- IATA flight No.: B9962
- ICAO flight No.: IRB962
- Call sign: IRAN AIRTOUR 962
- Registration: EP-ITD
- Flight origin: Mehrabad International Airport
- Destination: Mashhad International Airport
- Occupants: 131
- Passengers: 119
- Crew: 12
- Fatalities: 131
- Survivors: 0

Second aircraft
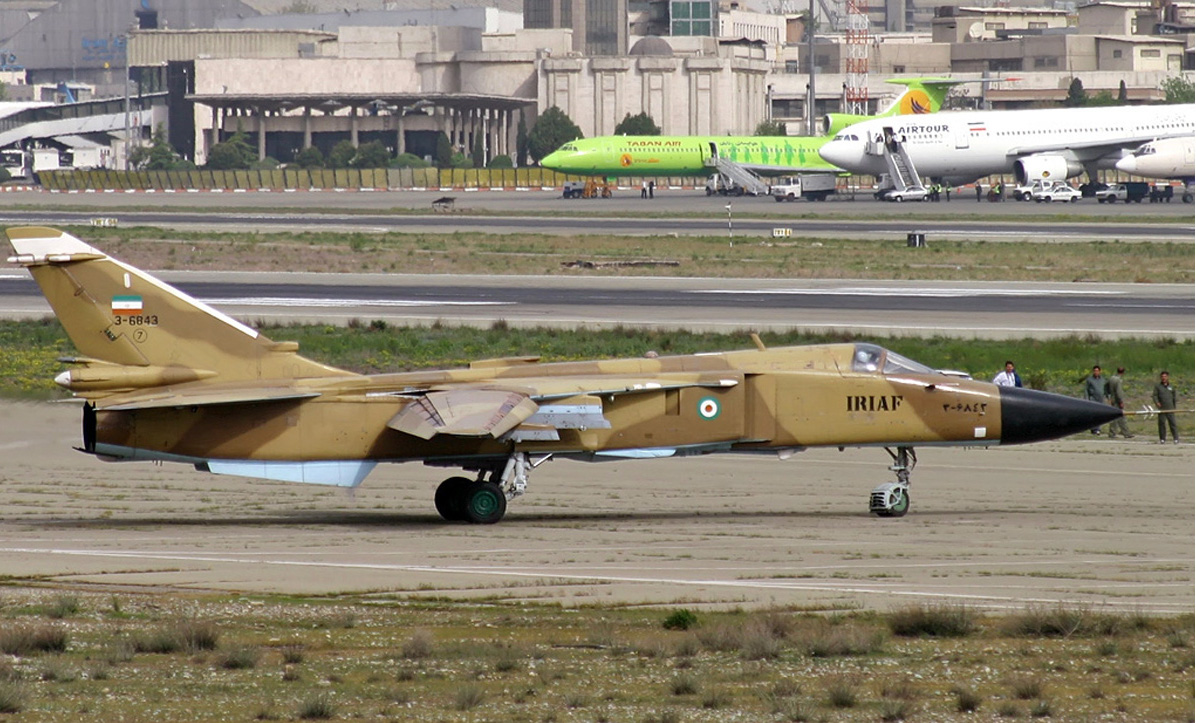
- An IRIAF Su-24
- Type: Sukhoi Su-24
- Operator: Iranian Air Force
- Registration: Unknown
- Flight origin: Unknown
- Destination: Mehrabad International Airport
- Occupants: 2
- Crew: 2
- Fatalities: 2
- Survivors: 0

On 8 February 1993, Iran Airtour Flight 962, a Tupolev Tu-154, collided in mid-air with an Islamic Republic of Iran Air Force (IRIAF) Sukhoi Su-24 attack aircraft near the Iranian capital of Tehran, killing all 133 people aboard both aircraft. It was the deadliest aviation accident in 1993.

== Aircraft ==
=== Iran Airtour Flight 962 ===
Flight 962, with 119 passengers and 12 crew on board, departed from runway 29R at Tehran's Mehrabad Airport on a non-scheduled domestic flight to Mashhad International Airport in Mashhad. The aircraft was flown by an unnamed Russian captain who had 12,000 flight hours (the information on the remaining flight crew is unknown). After takeoff, the aircraft was instructed to climb to 6,000 feet (1,800 m).

=== Sukhoi Su-24 ===
At the same time, five IRIAF Sukhoi Su-24 fighter jets were approaching Mehrabad's runway 29L using visual flight rules (VFR). They would later perform special maneuvers for the Iranian Revolution Commemoration Ceremony. The fighter jets flew in a westerly heading and were placed at an altitude of 5,000 feet (1,500 m) by Mehrabad air traffic controller (ATC) Faramarz Sarvi.

== Collision ==
Flight 962 was climbing at the direction of runway 29R, and at the same time the five Su-24s were descending to land on runway 29L. All five of them were separated one mile apart. One of the Su-24s, piloted by a crew of two pilots, turned left four miles west of the tower but did not have enough visibility as it was performing a go around. At this point, Flight 962 was nearing the Sukhoi fighter. Flight 962 and the Su-24 did not obtain visual sight of each other. At about 14:16 IRST, the two aircraft collided in mid-air; the rear engine and the tail of the Tupolev aircraft were torn off, and the flight crew lost control of the aircraft. Both aircraft crashed into an army depot at the town of Shahr-e Qods, near Tehransar, about 9.4 miles (15.1 km; 8.2 nmi) from Mehrabad. All 131 people aboard the Iran Airtour airliner and both military pilots died.

== Investigation ==
Investigators determined that the pilot of Flight 962 correctly followed ATC instructions. Iran's Civil Aviation Authority concluded that the causes of the collision were: errors made by the military pilots of the Sukhoi Su-24 and air traffic controller error. The primary causes were:

1. The air traffic controller's decision allowed Flight 962 to climb while the Sukhoi Su-24s were descending.
2. The controller failed to inform Flight 962 about the Sukhoi Su-24s entering their airspace.
3. Failure to notify the military pilots about take-off of a Tupolev at the same time as the Sukhoi turns left.
4. The controller did not express any concerns about the 1,000-foot (300 m) distance between the two aircraft.
5. The Sukhoi pilots failed to maintain the altitude as requested by the ATC, which caused the collision of the two aircraft.

== See also ==
- All Nippon Airways Flight 58
- Hughes Airwest Flight 706
- Libyan Arab Airlines Flight 1103
- List of Iranian aviation accidents and incidents
- Iran Airtour
