= Sayyid (name) =

Sayyid (also spelt Saiyed, Seyit, Seyd, Syed, Said, Sayed, Sayyed, Saiyid, Seyed, al-Sayyed, Seyyed and Syedna) (Arabic: سيد [ˈsæj.jɪd], Persian: [sejˈjed]; meaning 'Lord', 'Master'; plural: Sadat Arabic: سادة sādah is a masculine name given to descendants of the Islamic prophet Muhammad. It is not to be confused with Sa‘id (or Saeed, pronounced [sa'ʕiːd]).

== Given name ==
- Sayed Awad (1926–2000), Egyptian composer
- Sayed Darwish (1892–1923), Egyptian singer
- Sayed Gouda (born 1968), Egyptian poet
- Sayed Haider (1925–2020), Bangladeshi physician and Language Movement activist
- Sayed Marei (1913–1993), Egyptian engineer and politician
- Sayed Moawad (born 1979), Egyptian footballer
- Sayed Mosaad (born 1987), Egyptian footballer
- Sayed Yusuf (1896–1978), Indian field hockey player
- Sayyid Gaddaf al-Dam (1948–2023), Libyan brigadier general
- Sayyid Qutb (1906–1966), Egyptian political theorist and revolutionary
- Sayyed Mahmud Khan (died 1573), Great and powerful general in Akbar's army
- Seyed Zeinolabedin Seghatoleslam (1923–2000), Iranian Shia cleric
- Seyed Mohyeddin Seghatoleslam (born 1960), Iranian architect and urban designer
- Seyyed Ali Shafiei (1940–2025), Iranian Twelver Shia scholar
- Sayed Muhammad Gulabzoi (born 1951), Afghan General
- Sayyid Abdullah (1945–1978), first Vice-President of Afghanistan
- Sayed Ahmad Zia Muzafari, coach of the Afghanistan national football team (1979–1981)

== Syed ==
- Syed Abid Ali (1941–2025), Indian cricketer
- Syed Abul Maksud (1946–2021), Bangladeshi writer and columnist
- Syed Abdul Hadi (born 1940), Bangladeshi singer
- Syed Ahmed Khan (1817–1898), Indian educator and politician
- Syed Ahmed (born 1974), British Bangladeshi entrepreneur
- Syed Badrudduja (1900–1974), Indian-Bengali politician and activist
- Syed Faruk (born 1967), Singaporean football manager
- Syed Ali Hassan Gilani (1974–2024), Pakistani politician
- Syed Hussain (born 1922), Indian politician
- Syed Ibrahim (died 1353), Indian Sufi saint
- Syed Kirmani (born 1949), Indian cricketer
- Syed Mahmud (1889–1971), Indian politician
- Syed Manzoorul Islam (1951–2025), Bangladeshi author
- Syed Manzur Elahi (1942–2025), Bangladeshi businessman
- Syed Masood, fictional character, mispronounced as Sa‘id
- Syed Muhammad Asghar Shah (1949–2025), Pakistani politician
- Syed Mujtaba Ali (1904–1974), Bengali author
- Syed Mukhtaruddin Shah (1950–2025), Pakistani spiritual leader and Islamic scholar
- Syed Nomanul Haq (born 1948), Pakistani historian of philosophy and science
- Syed Rafi Uddin, Pakistani politician
- Syed Rashid Ali (born 1975), Danish cricketer
- Syed Saddiq Syed Abdul Rahman (born 1992), Malaysian politician
- Syed Sadequain Ahmed Naqvi (1930–1987), Pakistani artist referred to as Sadequain
- Syed Shamsul Haque (1935–2016), Bangladeshi poet
- Syed Sheh Hassan Barakbah (1906–1975), Malaysian judge
- Syed Ziaur Rahman (born 1972), Indian scientist and pharmacologist

== Seyid ==
- Seyid Riza (1863–1937), Kurdish rebel leader
- Seyid Azim Shirvani (1835–1888), Azerbaijani poet and engineer
- Seyid Shushinski (1889–1965), Azerbaijani folk singer
- Seyid Mirbabayev (1867–1953), Azerbaijani singer
- Seyid Abulgasim Nabat (1812–1873), Iranian Azerbaijani poet
- Ogtay Seyid Huseyn oghlu Sadigzade (1921–2014), Azerbaijani visual artist
- Seyid Imadeddin Nesimi (1369/70–1418/19), Azerbaijani poet

== Seyit ==
- Seyit Çabuk (1889–1939), Ottoman soldier
- Seyit Kırmızı (born 1950), Turkish Olympic cyclist
- Seyit Halil Özsoy (1948–2025), Turkish politician
- Seyit Cem Ünsal (born 1975), Turkish footballer
- Seyit Torun (born 1968), Turkish politician
- Onur Seyit Yaran (born 1995), Turkish actor
- Seyit Ahmet Demirci (born 1970), Turkish serial killer
- Seyit Mehmet Paşa, Ottoman statesman

== Surname ==
- Daoud Abdel Sayed (1946–2025), Egyptian director and screenwriter
- Ahmad al-Sayyed (born 1965), Syrian politician
- Khalid Al-Sayyid (born 1948), Lebanese actor and voice actor
- Abdul El-Sayed (born 1984), American politician and epidemiologist
- Nader El-Sayed (born 1972), Egyptian footballer
- Mohamed Elsayed (born 1973), Egyptian boxer
- Edward Said (1935–2003), Palestinian-American academic, literary critic, and political activist
- Shahi Sayed, Pakistani politician
- Cevat Seyit (1906–1945), Turkish footballer
- Anoosha Syed, Pakistani-Canadian illustrator and writer
- G. M. Syed (1904–1995), Pakistani politician
- Grethe Fatima Syéd (born 1968), Norwegian author

== See also ==
- Syed Ali, a related name, including a list of people with this name
- Seyid
