= Sayyidate =

Sayyidate may refer to:

- Khayat al-Sayyidate, a film by Duraid Lahham
- Sayyidat, a female equivalent of sayyid

== See also ==
- Sayyid (name)
