= Seyed Mohyeddin Seghatoleslam =

Iranian architect and urban designer (born 1960)

Seyed M. Seghatoleslam
- سید محی الدین ثقت الاسلام
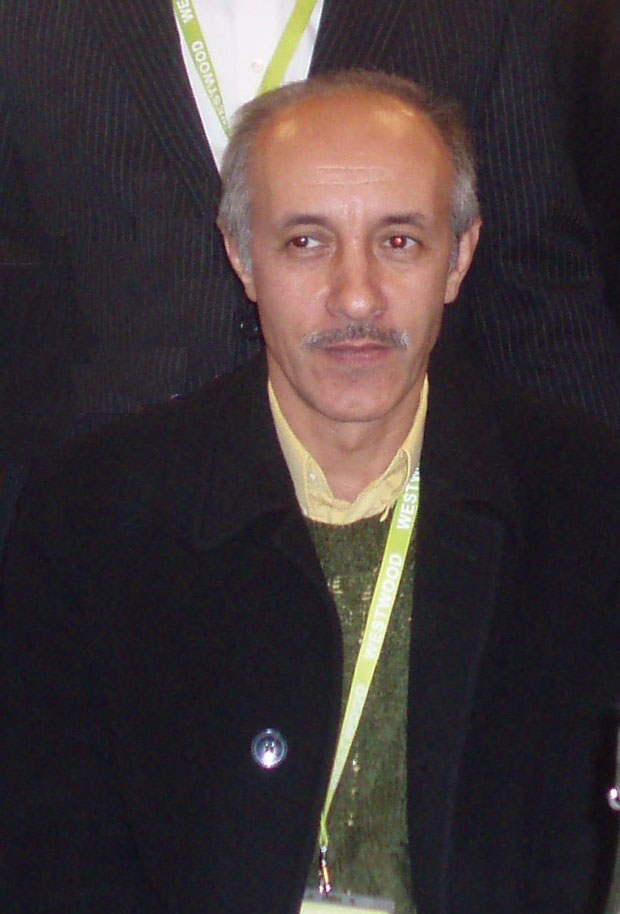
- Seghatoleslam in 2016
- Born: 1960 (age 65–66); Shiraz, Fars Province, Iran
- Education: National University of Iran
- Occupations: Author researcher urban designer architect
- Relatives: Tahereh Seghatoleslam; Atefeh Seghatoleslam

Seyed Mohyeddin Seghatoleslam(/ˈsejjed moˈdʒeddin seɡɑːtolesˈlɑːm/}) (Persian: سید محی الدین ثقت الاسلام; born 1960) is an Iranian architect and Urban designer from Shiraz, Fars province. His work includes design consultancy, project management, and urban planning. He has conducted research and authored publications related to architectural engineering.

== Early life and education ==
Seghatoleslam was born in Shiraz, located in Iran's Fars province. He spent his early years in Arsenjan, where he lived and studied until the age of ten. He then continued his education in Shiraz before pursuing a degree in architecture at the School of Architecture and Urban Design at the National University of Iran (now Shahid Beheshti University). His dissertation, The Design and Study of the Tehran TV Tower, explored the architectural and structural features of about fifty television towers worldwide. Building on this research, he designed and proposed a 430-metre television tower for Tehran's Gisha district. The proposal aimed for the structure to be a multifunctional landmark, celebrated for its varied uses and symbolic importance as a key feature of the city.

Beyond his formal education, Seghatoleslam has completed specialised training programs, including courses offered by the Tehran Urban Building Control Headquarters that focus on legal, executive, and financial ordinances. He has also studied competency management systems and engineering management for projects, refining his expertise in design and project management.

== Career ==
Seghatoleslam has developed a diverse career in architecture and urban design, overseeing numerous projects from conceptualisation to completion. His portfolio spans architectural design, urban design, and project management, with experience in leading multidisciplinary teams and managing large-scale developments.

His work encompasses master planning, feasibility studies, and strategic frameworks for urban development. He has been involved in addressing complex design challenges, incorporating functionality, aesthetics, and environmental considerations. He managed a consulting engineering firm for several years, overseeing urban projects in multiple cities across Iran.

According to the Iranian Patent Office (IPO), he is the registered holder of two patents: one for a Soilless green wall system (reg. number 75418), and another for a Bladeless jet fan intended to enhance energy efficiency (reg. number 77048).

== Notable projects ==
Seghatoleslam has worked on a wide range of architectural and urban design projects.

=== Architectural projects ===
As a designer and project manager, he has contributed to a range of architectural projects, including:

- Hyde Park Crescent Mansion – Six-Storey House Extension and Refurbishment, London
- Luxury Apartment Renovation – The Quadrangle- Southwick Street, London
- Clifton Hill Luxury Residence – Renovation and Interior Design- St. John's Wood, London
- Contemporary Luxury Home – Lonsdale Road, London
- Faculties of Law, Literature and Humanities – Hesarak City, Islamic Azad University, Tehran
- Master Plan for Islamic Azad University – Karaj city, Alborz province
- Kasbakh Apartment Complex (7 Hectares) – Rasht City, Gilan province
- Clothing Production factory design (4000 m^{2}) – Silon Company, Rey County, Tehran province
- Residential and commercial block (240 units) – Housing Union of Tehran Industries, Greater Tehran
- Tehransar Residential Building (342 units, 26000 m^{2}) – Tehransar city, Greater Tehran
- Luxury Villa renovation (2000 m^{2}) – Shahrak Gharb Borough, Greater Tehran

=== Urban design projects ===
In addition to his work in architecture, he has led several urban design initiatives, including:

- Fardis real estate development (60 hectares) – Saberin Housing Union, Fardis city, Alborz Province
- Comprehensive Urban Development Plans for Hendijan, Aghajari, Mollasani, and Lali Cities – Khuzestan province
- Land-use planning studies in Gilan, Khuzestan, and Kermanshah Provinces – Ministry of Housing and Urban Development, Tehran
- Master plans for Andimeshk and Shoosh counties – Department of Housing and Urban Development, Khuzestan Province
- Residential Development (68 hectares) – Cooperatives Union, Karaj city, Alborz Province
- Master plans for new cities in Dezful (1400 Hectares), Shoosh (350 Hectares), Abadan (91 Hectares), and Susangerd (200 Hectares) – Khuzestan Province
- Real estate development projects in Abadan (191 Hectares), Susangerd (112 Hectares), Ghasr-e Shirin (400 Hectares), Koopiteh Dezful (320 Hectares), and Shoosh (185 Hectares) Cities – Khuzestan Province

== Publications and research ==
Seghatoleslam has authored books and research papers focusing on architectural engineering and design.

Notable works include:

- Principles of Concrete Telecom Towers Design – A comprehensive guide in Persian for architects and engineers that details the design of concrete telecom towers over 200 meters tall.
- Structural Arrangements for Telecom Towers & Masts – A Persian language book discussing telecom structures, construction methods, and principles of design.
- The Architect & the Law – A book outlining legal considerations for architects, covering professional qualifications, contract formation, and dispute resolution.
- An Idea for the Hammersmith Bridge Issue – A research paper proposing a solution for the Hammersmith Bridge in London.
