= Syed Ali =

Syed Ali (also spelled Sayyed Ali, Sayyid Ali, etc.) may refer to:

- Mir Sayyid Ali Hamadani (1314–1384), a Persian Sufi who spread Islam in Kashmir
- Seyed Ali Seghatoleslam Arsenjani (1923–2000), Iranian Shia cleric
- Syed Ameer Ali (1849–1928), Indian scholar who taught at Aligarh Muslim University
- Syed Ghous Ali Shah (born 1934), former Chief Minister of Sindh, Pakistan
- Syed Ali Shah Geelani (1929–2021), politician from Jammu and Kashmir
- Syed Ali Raza, President and Chairman of the National Bank of Pakistan
- Syed Ali (cricketer) (1913–1993), Trinidadian cricketer
- Syed Ali (field hockey, born 1942) (1942–2010), or Syed Mushtaq Ali, field hockey player from India, won 1964 Olympic gold medal
- Syed Ali (field hockey, born 1956), Indian Olympic hockey player
- Syed Ali Ahsan (1922–2002), writer, poet, and professor at the University of Dhaka
- Syed Ali Nawaz Shah Rizvi (born 1942), former federal Minister in the Cabinet of the government of Pakistan
- Syed Ali Qutab Shah Rizvi, member of the Pakistani Sindh Provincial Assembly in Pakistan
- Syed Ali Naqi Zaidi, poet, known as Safi Lakhnavi
- Syed Ali Ashraf, founder of Darul Ihsan University
- Syed Modasser Ali (born 1946), Bangladeshi ophthalmic surgeon
- Ali H. Sayed, Brazilian-American engineer and computer scientist

== See also ==
- Sayyid
- Sayyid (name)
- Sa‘id
