= Air Kufra =

Air Kufra الكُفرة للطيران Ālküfråh Lìltāíärän
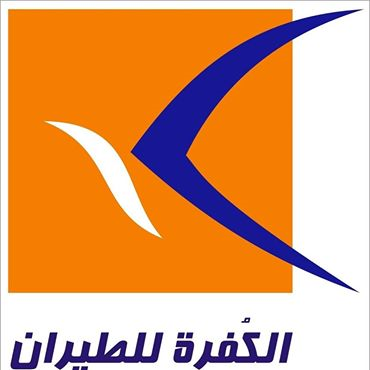
IATA	ICAO	Call sign
7F	KAV	AIRKUFRA
- Founded: 2005
- Commenced operations: 2008
- Ceased operations: 2010
- Operating bases: Tripoli International Airport; Malta International Airport
- Hubs: Kufra Airport
- Subsidiaries: Air Kufra Aviation Training Center
- Fleet size: 2 ^{a}
- Destinations: 3 ^{b}
- Parent company: Buraq Air
- Headquarters: Tripoli, Libya
- Key people: Giuma Nasir (CEO); Abdurrazag Zaatut (COO)
- Website: airkufra.com.ly

Notes
- a. Only active planes are the planes at the Training Center.; b. As was before closing.

Air Kufra (Arabic: الكُفرة للطيران) (IATA: 7F, ICAO: KAV) was a small Libyian charter airline. It was mainly operated out of Kufra Airport. It had only one commercial aircraft, which was leased from Buraq Air, along with a cargo aircraft, an Ilyushin Il-76TD. The airline had two bases: the main base was in Tripoli, Libya, and the other was located in Kufra Airport, Al Jawf. The airline was run by Giuma Nasir (CEO) and Abdurrazag Zaatut (COO).

== History ==
Air Kufra was a short lived airline, which reportedly had operations between 2008 and 2010. The airline also offered cargo services. Also, on February 25, 2009, Air Kufra announced it will be opening a training center in Tripoli.

=== Training center ===
The Air Kufra training center was founded in 2007, to encourage Libyans to get into aviation, and is still open. The training center operates Cessna 172s. The Cessna 172s were sold to Air Kufra in 2007 from Africair. It was the first US corporation to sell US manufactured goods into Libya after the sanctions were lifted.

== Fleet ==
These are the only known aircraft Air Kufra had:

Air Kufra fleet
Passenger fleet
Aircraft	In service	Retired	Passengers	Notes	Refs
British Aerospace Jetstream 32	—	1	21	Leased from Buraq Air	
Cessna 172	2	—	2	Used at the training center	
Cargo Fleet
Ilyushin Il-76TD	—	1	Cargo		
Total	2	2			

=== History ===
The British Aerospace Jetstream 32, tail number 5A-DGR, Serial Number 945, was delivered to Buraq Air on August 19, 2004. The plane was used by 2 prior airlines, Dong-Ah Group and British Aerospace. It was 13 years old when it was delivered, having taken its first flight on December 2, 1991. The aircraft's current status is unknown. The Ilyushin Il-76TD, tail number UN-76008 was also leased from Buraq Air. It was used by 6 prior airlines. It was delivered to Buraq Air on 26 February 2004. The plane was later passed on to the GST Aero Aircompany in March 2006. It was 21 years old when it was delivered, having take its first flight on October 31, 1983.

== Operations ==
=== Destinations ===
These are the Air Kufra destinations (Before closing):

Country	City	Airport	Airport codes		Notes	Refs
Country	City	Airport	IATA	ICAO	Notes	Refs
Libya	Al Jawf	Kufra Airport	AKF	HLKF	Hub	
Libya	Tripoli	Tripoli International Airport	TIP	HLLT		
Malta	Valletta	Malta International Airport	MLA	LMML		

=== Passenger Services ===
Air Kufra provided many charter services. They were used for passenger and cargo charter services. For passenger charter, they could provide regular charter, helicopter services and desert dispatches. They are also equipped for both national and international services.

=== Training center ===
The training center is located at 32°37′38″N 013°10′04.5″E in Qasr bin Ghashir, Libya. It operates 2 Cessna 172s, 5A-KFA and 5A-KFB. In order to achieve its goal of modern aircraft, its aircraft are fitted with new efficient diesel engines. Also, they were fitted with the FNPTII from Alsim. The training center is ISO 9001/2008 certified. The Training center provides training courses to become a Private Pilot and a Commercial Pilot.
