= Seghatoleslam (name) =

Name list

Seghatoleslam (also spelt Seqat-ol-eslam, and Thiqat ul-Islam) [Persian: ثقت الاسلام, Arabic: ثقة الاسلام] is derived from two Arabic words: ثقة, meaning trustworthy, and Islam [Arabic: اسلام] referring to the Islam's religion. Consequently, the word can be translated as Trustworthy of Islam.

It may refer to:

== People ==
=== Seghatoleslam as a surname ===
- Atefeh Seghatoleslam (born 1969), Researcher and professor at Shiraz University
- Masoumeh Seghatoleslam, Researcher
- Seyed Abdullah Seghatoleslam (1868-1962), Iranian Twelver Shia clergyman
- Seyed Mohyeddin Seghatoleslam (born 1960), Iranian Architect and Urban Designer
- Seyed Zeinolabedin Seghatoleslam (also known as Seyed Ali Seghatoleslam Arsenjani) (1923-2000), Shia cleric and Islamic jurist
- Tahereh Seghatoleslam (born 1957), Researcher and professor at the University of Malaya

=== Seghatoleslam as a religious title ===
- Abu Jafar Muhammad ibn Ali ibn Babawayh al-Qummi, known as Seghatoleslam Sheikh Saduq (923-991), Shia Hadith collector
- Mirza Ali Aqa Tabrizi, known as Seghatoleslam Tabrizi (1861-1911), Iranian reformist Shia cleric
- Muhammad bin Fadlallah al-Sarawi, known as Seghatoleslam Sarawi, (d. 1924), Islamic scholar and poet
- Muhammad ibn Yaqub al-Kulayni, known as Seghatoleslam Kulayni (864-941), Shia Hadith collector
- Sheikh Mohammad Ali Isfahani, known as Seghatoleslam Isfahani (1854-1900), Shia clergyman

== See also ==
- Seghatoleslam
