= Libyan Arab Airlines Flight 1103 =

1992 mid-air collision

Accident
- Date: 22 December 1992
- Summary: Mid-air collision
- Site: Near Tripoli International Airport, Tripoli, Libya; 32°39′59″N 13°17′44″E
- Total fatalities: 159
- Total injuries: 2
- Total survivors: 2

First aircraft
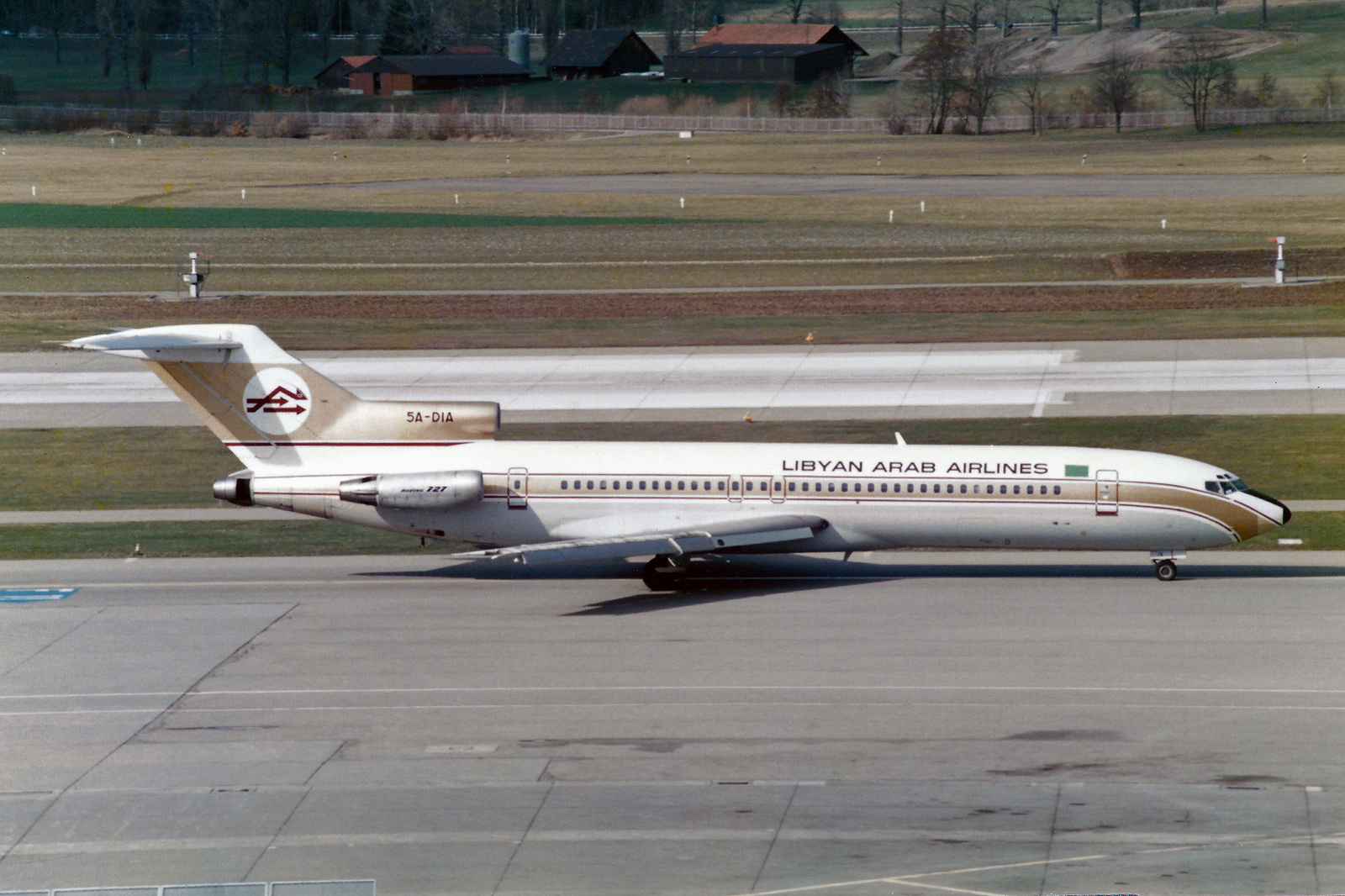
- 5A-DIA, the Boeing 727 involved, photographed in 1986
- Type: Boeing 727-2L5 (Note: The aircraft was a Boeing 727-200 model; Boeing assigns a unique code for each company that buys one of its aircraft, which is applied as a suffix to the model number at the time the aircraft is built, hence "727-2L5" for a Boeing 727-200 built for Libyan Arab Airlines.)
- Operator: Libyan Arab Airlines
- IATA flight No.: LN1103
- ICAO flight No.: LAA1103
- Call sign: LIBYAN 1103
- Registration: 5A-DIA
- Flight origin: Benina International Airport
- Destination: Tripoli International Airport
- Occupants: 159
- Passengers: 150
- Crew: 9
- Fatalities: 159
- Survivors: 0

Second aircraft
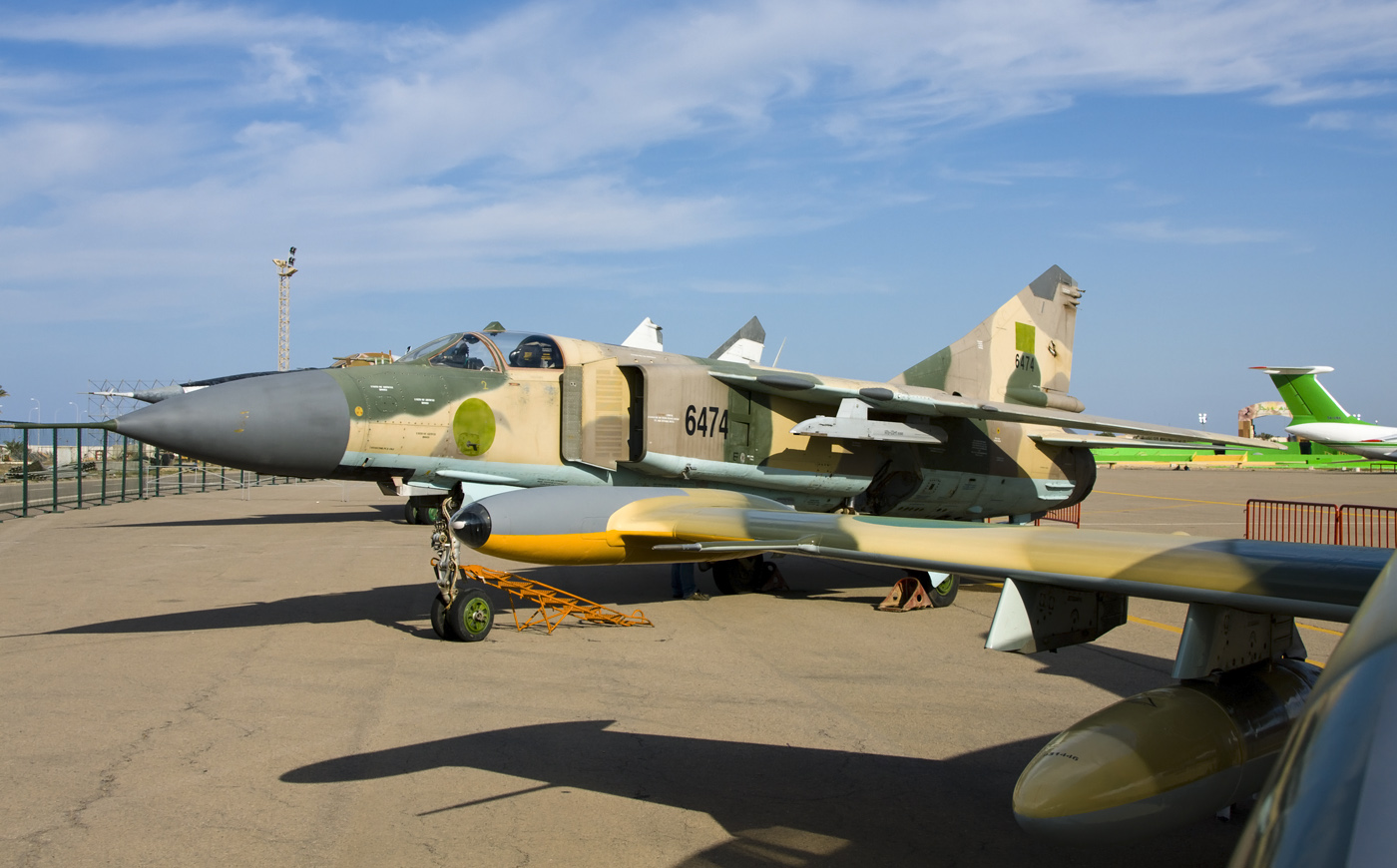
- A Libyan Air Force MiG-23, similar to the one involved
- Type: Mikoyan-Gurevich MiG-23UB
- Operator: Libyan Air Force
- Registration: 8428
- Occupants: 2
- Crew: 2
- Fatalities: 0
- Injuries: 2
- Survivors: 2

Libyan Arab Airlines Flight 1103 was a Boeing 727-2L5 with 9 crew members and 150 passengers on board that collided with a LARAF Mikoyan-Gurevich MiG-23UB on 22 December 1992. All 159 people on board Flight 1103 were killed, while the pilot and instructor of the MiG-23 ejected and survived. It is the deadliest aviation disaster to occur in Libya.

== Background ==
=== Aircraft ===
The first aircraft was a passenger Boeing 727-2L5 with MSN 21050. Registered as 5A-DIA, it was manufactured by Boeing Commercial Airplanes in February 1975 and was delivered to Libyan Arab Airlines that same year. Until the time of the accident, it had flown a total of nearly 36,000 flight hours. It was equipped with three Pratt & Whitney JT8D-15 engines, all of which had an average total of 25,000 flight hours.

The second aircraft involved was a Mikoyan-Gurevich MiG-23UB. Registered as 8428 with MSN B-1038428, it was manufactured in July 1984 and was brought to service in March 1985. It had a total of 560 flight hours. It was equipped with a Tumansky M-47 engine that had a total flight time of 575 hours.

=== Passengers and crew ===
The Boeing 727 was operated in an all-economy configuration, with 161 economy class seats. Of the 159 occupants, there were 9 crew members and 150 passengers, including 5 deadheading crew.

In command of Flight 1103 was 41-year-old Captain Ali al-Faqi, he had a total of over 10,900 flight hours with more than 9,200 hours on the Boeing 727. He was qualified as a Boeing 727 instructor pilot and was valid until July 1993. His co-pilot was 32-year-old First Officer Mahmoud Eissa; he had a total of over 1,800 flight hours with almost 480 on the Boeing 727. The flight engineer, 36-year-old Salem Abu-Sitta, had only flown on board the Boeing 727 and had clocked nearly 2,400 total flight hours.

On board the MiG-23 were 38-year-old Major Abdul-Majid al-Tayari and 32-year-old Lieutenant Colonel Ahmed Abu-Sneina. The instructor, Major al-Tayari, had a total of 1,300 flight hours with 550 hours on the make and model, while the pilot, Lieutenant Colonel Abu-Sneina, had a total of 700 flight hours, including 325 on the MiG-23.

There were two air traffic controllers on duty that day, including one civilian controller and one military controller.

The controller, 23-year-old Maryam al-Mashai, was still undergoing training at the time of the accident under the supervision of 34-year-old Omar Abu-Daber. The military controller that day was 27-year-old Abdullah Kareer.

== Crash ==
On 22 December 1992, Flight 1103 took off from Benina International Airport near Benghazi on a domestic flight to Tripoli International Airport under the command of Captain al-Faqi, First Officer Eissa, and Flight Engineer Abu-Sitta.

At an altitude of 3,161 ft (960 m) above sea level, during the Boeing 727's approach to Tripoli airport, the aircraft's tail collided with a Mikoyan-Gurevich MiG-23's right wing and disintegrated, resulting in the deaths of all 159 passengers and crew. The two crew members of the MiG-23, Major al-Tayari and Lieutenant Colonel Abu-Sneina ejected before impact and survived.

== Investigation and aftermath ==
The official explanation and air accident investigation report both blamed a collision with a Libyan Air Force MiG-23; the pilot and instructor of the MiG were imprisoned.

After the crash, a spokesman for the Libyan Civil Authority stated he had been forbidden from releasing any information about the crash, including which planes had been involved. A mass grave was prepared for the victims outside of Tripoli with poor international relations denying the bodies of international victims being returned to their families.

Ali Aujali, who served as a Libyan diplomat both under Gaddafi and under the subsequent National Transitional Council, claims that Gaddafi ordered that the Boeing 727, whose flight was assigned the number 1103, be shot down exactly four years to the day after the bombing of Pan Am Flight 103 in order to demonstrate the negative effects of international sanctions imposed on Libya. According to Aujali, the dictator originally ordered a bomb with a timer to be in the aircraft, but when this failed to explode, he "ordered the [aircraft] to be knocked out of the sky". The widow of one British victim has claimed Libyan families of victims had asked if she had tested her husband's passports for explosive residue.

== Memorials ==
The first memorial for the crash was held near Tripoli, Libya in 2012. The ceremony was attended by families and friends of the victims, and politicians.

== See also ==
- Hughes Airwest Flight 706
- All Nippon Airways Flight 58
- Gol Transportes Aéreos Flight 1907
- 1983 Negev mid-air collision
- Iran Air Flight 655
- 1993 Tehran mid-air collision
- 1997 Israeli helicopter disaster
