= United Libya Airlines =

United Libyan Airlines
IATA	ICAO	Call sign
—	—	—
- Founded: 1962
- Ceased operations: 2 October 1965
- Fleet size: 1
- Headquarters: Benghazi, Libya
- Key people: C. J. Bicknell (general manager)

United Libyan Airlines was a Libyan charter airline, headquartered in Benghazi.

== History ==
The company was set up in early 1962 as a Libyan-owned charter airline that initially employed British crews. The airline took delivery of its first aircraft, a British-registered Douglas DC-3 bought from Autair, in March 1962.

United Libyan Airlines was absorbed into Kingdom of Libya Airlines on 2 October 1965.
