= Seghatoleslam =

Honorific title within the Twelver Shia clergy

Seghatoleslam (Persian: ثقت الاسلام ) also spelled Seqat-ol-Eslam, or Thiqat ul-Islam, is an honorific title within the Twelver Shia clergy. Historically, it denoted a scholar who had completed a certain level of religious education but had not yet attained the highest authority in the religious hierarchy, known as Ayatollah. In the recent past, it was typically conferred upon individuals who had completed Islamic seminary levels 1 and 2, obtaining a degree in Islamic jurisprudence (Fiqh) and theology (Usul al-Din). The title also signifies a trustworthy person respected by Muslims, reflecting a specific level of seminary knowledge.

== Etymology ==
The term Seghatoleslam (Persian: ثقت الاسلام, Arabic: ثقة الاسلام, romanized: Thiqat ul-Islām) is derived from two Arabic words: thiqa (ثقة), meaning trustworthy, and Islām (اسلام). Consequently, the title can be translated as Trustworthy of Islam.

In Usulism, a branch of Islamic biographical evaluation, issuing a fatwa is only permissible by trusting the words of authenticated narrators, and Seghatoleslam designates narrators whose justice and trustworthiness have been explicitly verified.

== Seghatoleslam as a religious title ==
In Shia Islam, Seghatoleslam was historically viewed as a precursor to the higher title of Ayatollah, as achieving Ayatollah status required additional years of study and research beyond the Seghatoleslam degree.

Although the majority of Iran's population is Shia Muslim, the use of the title Seghatoleslam is not widespread in Iran. It was, however, utilised in other countries with substantial Shia Muslim populations, such as Iraq.

The application of religious titles in Shia Islam is not uniform, and variations exist in how these titles are employed and understood in different contexts.

The title Seghatoleslam was initially used for Muhammad ibn Yaqub al-Kulayni (864 -941), the compiler of al-Kaafi. According to Mudir Shanachi, "al-Kulayni was known as Seghatoleslam in his time".

=== Difference between the titles Ayatollah, Hujjatoleslam, and Seghatoleslam ===
The conceptual evolution of titles for Shia Islam clerics in Iran has changed over time. Seghatoleslam, once used for the students in preliminary stages, was previously the title of eminent scholars. Some titles, like Grand Ayatollah, became prevalent and are exclusively applied to Maraji, meaning religious scholars who are references for others. At different times, the title Akhund, was used for great scholars such as Akhund Molla Mohammad Kazim Khurasani or Akhund Molla Mohammad Baqer Majlesi. These titles in seminaries are conventional, without a specific institution awarding them.

In the past, Seghatoleslam referred to scholars at level 1 and 2. Presently, the primary objective of the level 1 and 2 courses is to teach Arabic literature, including grammar, semantics, eloquence. Students are also familiarised with basic subjects such as Logic and Jurisprudence, usually from the books like Jame-ol Moghaddamat, al-Mughni, and Suyuti.

The duration of the taught course typically spans three years for the Arabic literature course, along with an addition three years for the Logic and Jurisprudence courses.

In earlier times, Seghatoleslam was a title bestowed upon distinguished scholars, such as Sheikh Muhammad ibn Yaqub al-Kulayni or Sheikh al-Saduq. However, this title is not presently used in seminaries in Iran.

Hujjatoleslam refers to students at level 3. During this stage, books like Mo'alem al-Usul or Usul al-Istinbat, Al-Mujaz, Usul al-Fiqh Muzafar, Rasa'il, and Kafiya tol-Usul are usually taught. Additionally, Jurisprudence books such as Sharh Lom-e and Makaseb are included in the curriculum.

The duration of the taught course typically spans four years.

Upon entering the next stage (advanced level 4) and reaching the kharej (advanced courses of the seminary) study level, students are conferred the title Hujjatoleslam Wal-Muslemin. This stage is regarded as the highest course of seminary courses, aiming to produce mujtahids in the fields of Islamic jurisprudence (Fiqh) or theology (Usul al-Din). The goal is to develop the ability to derive rulings from authentic sources [books (Qur'anic sciences), Sunnah, wisdom, and consensus]. This stage usually does not rely on specific textbooks but is structured around the sufficiency of principles in Jurisprudence and Jawaher al-Kalam, Tahrir al-Wasila, and Urwa tol-Wosgha in Jurisprudence. It is essentially a research-oriented course.

The taught course at this stage typically lasts a minimum of four years.

In the past, the title Hujjatoleslam Wal-Muslemin was used for Maraji, such as the Risalah of the late Ayatollah Hossein Borujerdi was published under the title Hujjatoleslam Wal-Muslemin Hossein Borujerdi, or, for example, Muhammad al-Ghazali, had this title in the past. However, today these titles hold a different meaning.

Ayatollah refers to an individual who has successfully completed the kharej course (advanced courses of the seminary) and reached the level of Ijtihad. Ijtihad implies the ability to independently derive rulings using legal and principled evidence and foundations.

There are two types of mujtahids: the bounded mujtahid, who is proficient in specific chapters of Fiqh, and the absolute mujtahid, who is proficient in all chapters of Fiqh.

Apart from completing advanced studies, an individual must teach a kharej course (advanced courses of the seminary) of Islamic jurisprudence (Fiqh) or theology (Usul al-Din) for several years to attain the title of Ayatollah.

== Seghatoleslam as a family name in Iran ==
While Seghatoleslam is primarily a title in Shia Islam, it is also used as a surname in some Iranian families. This is because, in many cultures, it is common for people to use titles as family names or to use a religious or cultural term that reflects their identity as their family name.

The utilisation of Seghatoleslam as a family name is relatively uncommon and mostly confined to Iran / Persia. In other countries, even those with significant Shia Muslim populations, people tend to adopt other family names that mirror their cultural or ethnic identity.

=== Notable Seghatoleslam family in Iran ===
Individuals with the Seghatoleslam family name may be residing in Shiraz, Tabriz, or other parts of Iran / Persia, considering it is a distinct family name in the region. Notable family members in Iran include:

1. Mirza Ali Aqa Seghatoleslam Tabrizi (January 19, 1861 – December 31, 1911) was an Iranian nationalist who lived in Tabriz City, Iran, during the Persian Constitutional Revolution and was a reformist Shia cleric.
2. Seyed Zeinolabedin Seghatoleslam (also known as Seyed Ali Seghatoleslam Arsenjani) (December 1923 – June 2000) was an Iranian Twelver Shia clergyman who lived in Arsenjan City (Fars province) and Shiraz, Iran. He was one of the most influential intellectuals among the people of Arsenjan City and Arsenjan County. He was engaged in teaching Islamic jurisprudence (Fiqh) and Islamic sciences in Arsenjan seminaries while he was in charge of managing the seminaries.
3. Mohammad Ali Seghatoleslam Isfahani (1854 – 1900) was an Iranian Shia clergyman who lived in Isfahan, Iran. He was one of the great scholars and jurists of his era in Isfahan City (Isfahan province) and had complete knowledge and expertise in all branches of Islamic jurisprudence (Fiqh).
4. Seyed Abdullah Seghatoleslam (July 3, 1868 – July 8, 1962) was an Iranian Twelver Shia clergyman who lived in Isfahan City, Iran, and Najaf, Iraq. He was engaged in teaching and authoring books in Najaf City and left valuable works in Islamic sciences.

== See also ==
- Seghatoleslam (name)
- Ulama
- Akhund
- Hawza
- Marja'
- Ijtihad
- Ayatollah
- Mohyeddin
