= Petro Air =

Airline of Libya

IATA	ICAO	Call sign
-	PEO	PETRO AIR
- Hubs: Tripoli International Airport
- Fleet size: 9
- Headquarters: Tripoli, Libya
- Key people: Mosbah Matoug (Chairman-CEO)
- Website: petroair.ly

Petro Air is a charter airline based in Tripoli, Libya. It is banned from flying into EU airspace.

== Fleet ==
=== Current fleet ===
As of July 2026, Petro Air operates the following aircraft:

Petro Air fleet
Aircraft	In fleet	Order	Passenger	Notes
Bombardier Dash 8-300	2	0	50	
De Havilland Canada DHC-6-300 Twin Otter	4	0		
De Havilland Canada DHC-6-400 Twin Otter	1	0		
Embraer 170	2	0	76	
Total:	9	0		

=== Former fleet ===
As of August 2025, Petro Air operated 1 Bombardier Dash 8-300, 5 De Havilland Canada DHC-6 Twin Otter and 1 Embraer 170.

The airline also previously operated the following aircraft:

- 3 further De Havilland Canada DHC-6-300 Twin Otter
- 2 further Embraer 170
- 1 Fokker F28 Fellowship 2000
