= Seyed Zeinolabedin Seghatoleslam =

Iranian Twelver Shia Ayatollah (1923–2000)

Ayatollah Seyed Zeinolabedin Seghatoleslam Arsenjani
- Title: Ayatollah

Personal life
- Born: December , 1923 Arsenjan, Iran
- Died: June 1, 2000 (aged 76) Shiraz, Iran
- Resting place: Arsenjan
- Other name: Seyed Ali Seghatoleslam Arsenjani

Religious life
- Religion: Usuli Twelver Shia Islam

Senior posting
- Based in: Shiraz, Arsenjan, Iran

Seyed Zeinolabedin Seghatoleslam (Persian: سید زین‌ العابدین ثقت‌ الاسلام; December 1923 – June 2000), also known as Seyed Ali Seghatoleslam Arsenjani (Persian: سید علی ثقت الاسلام ارسنجانی), was an Iranian Twelver Shia cleric and religious scholar from Arsenjan, Fars Province, Iran. He was noted for his contributions to Islamic jurisprudence, theology, and the development of Shia seminarian education in Arsenjan city and Arsenjan county.

== Early life and education ==
Seghatoleslam was born in December 1923 in Arsenjan into a family with a strong religious and scholarly background. Raised in a devout Shia household, he pursued Islamic studies from an early age and gained recognition for his dedication to religious learning.

== Religious career ==
Seghatoleslam became a prominent figure in Arsenjan County's religious and educational life. He taught Islamic jurisprudence (fiqh), theology, Arabic literature, and logic, mentoring numerous students in traditional Shia seminarian disciplines. He also managed local seminaries, overseeing curriculum development and institutional organisation. His leadership contributed to establishing Arsenjan’s seminaries as regional centres of Shia scholarship.

== Influence and community role ==
Throughout his career, Seghatoleslam played a significant role in linking seminary education with community needs. He was regarded as one of the most influential religious intellectuals in Arsenjan and neighbouring districts. His work combined scholarly rigour with active engagement in local religious affairs, helping sustain Shia educational traditions in the region.

== Death and funeral ==
Seghatoleslam died on 1 June 2000 in Shiraz. His funeral was held on 3 June 2000 in Arsenjan and was attended by large numbers of mourners from Arsenjan, Shiraz, and surrounding towns. The city entered a period of partial closure during the mourning ceremonies, which included Qur’an recitations, memorial gatherings, and public expressions of grief. The scale of the funeral reflected his prominence in the religious and cultural life of the community.

== Legacy ==
Seghatoleslam is remembered as one of the most respected clerics in Arsenjan during the 20th century. His influence continues through his students, the seminaries he helped develop, and his contributions to Shia jurisprudence and religious education. His name remains associated with integrity, devotion, and scholarly excellence.

== See also ==
- Seghatoleslam
- Ulama
- Seghatoleslam (Name)
- Hawza
- Marja'
- Ijtihad
- Ayatollah
