= Libyan Arab Air Cargo =

Airline of Libya

Libyan Air Cargo
| IATA | ICAO | Call sign |
|---|---|---|
| - | LCR | LIBAC |
- Founded: 1979
- Fleet size: 3
- Headquarters: Tripoli, Libya

Libyan Air Cargo was a cargo airline based in Tripoli, Libya. It was the cargo division of Libyan Airlines, operating all-cargo services. Its main base was Tripoli International Airport. It served destinations throughout Africa, Europe, and Asia.

As of January 2026, the airline's current status is listed as "Out of Business".

== History ==
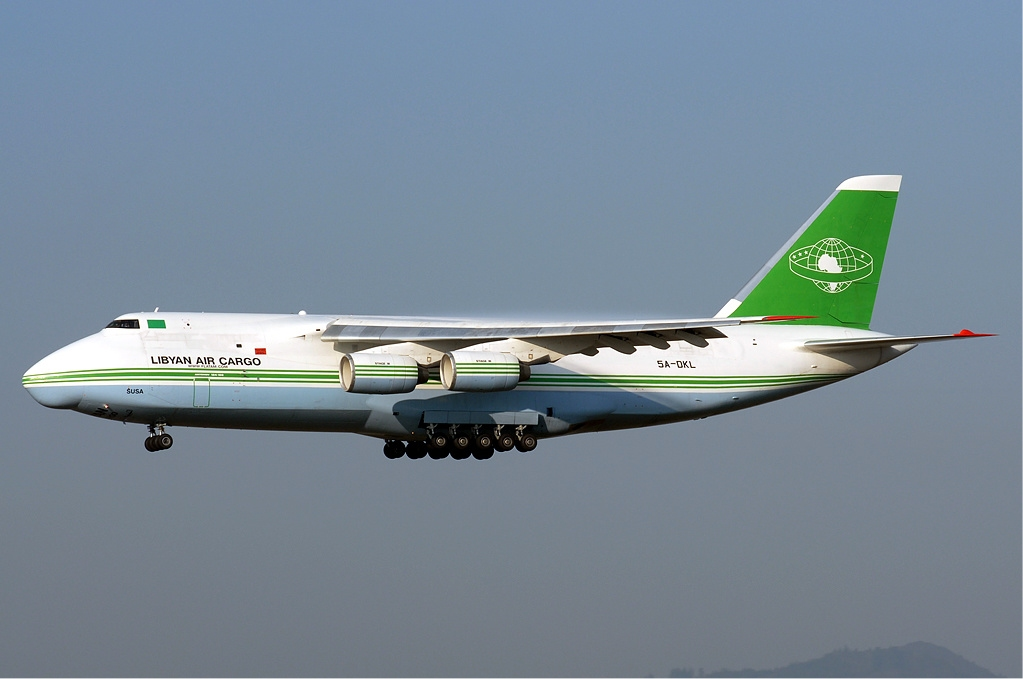
Antonov An-124 of LAC at Zurich International Airport in 2007

The airline was established in 1979 as United African Airlines and rebranded Jamahiriya Air Transport in 1982. It was merged into Libyan Air Cargo in 1993. In 2002, it became the first airline outside of Russia and Ukraine to operate the world's second-largest aircraft, the Antonov An-124.

== Fleet ==
As of June 2019, the Libyan Air Cargo fleet consisted of the following aircraft. Since the Libyan Revolution most of them are grounded.

- Antonov An-124-100 5A-DKL Susa, built in 1992, ex-Air Ukraine. Returned to Antonov, in storage in Ukraine since 2009. In 2022 the aircraft was threatened by fighting at Sviatoshyn Airfield in the Battle of Kyiv, but as of 3 March 2022 was undamaged.
- Ilyushin Il-76 5A-DRS

=== Previously operated ===
- One Boeing 707-320C, now retired
- Lockheed L-100 Hercules
- Antonov An-124-100 5A-DKN Sabrata, built in 1994, ex-Volga-Dnepr Airlines. Destroyed during Libyan Civil War as a result of heavy fighting in Tripoli in June 2019.
- Several Ilyushin Il-76, including 5A-DNK and 5A-DNG (Jamahiria Air Transport). 5A-DNG destroyed during "Operation Libya Dawn" in July 2014.
