= Libyan Airlines =

Flag carrier of Libya; based in Tripoli

Libyan Airlines الخطوط الجوية الليبية

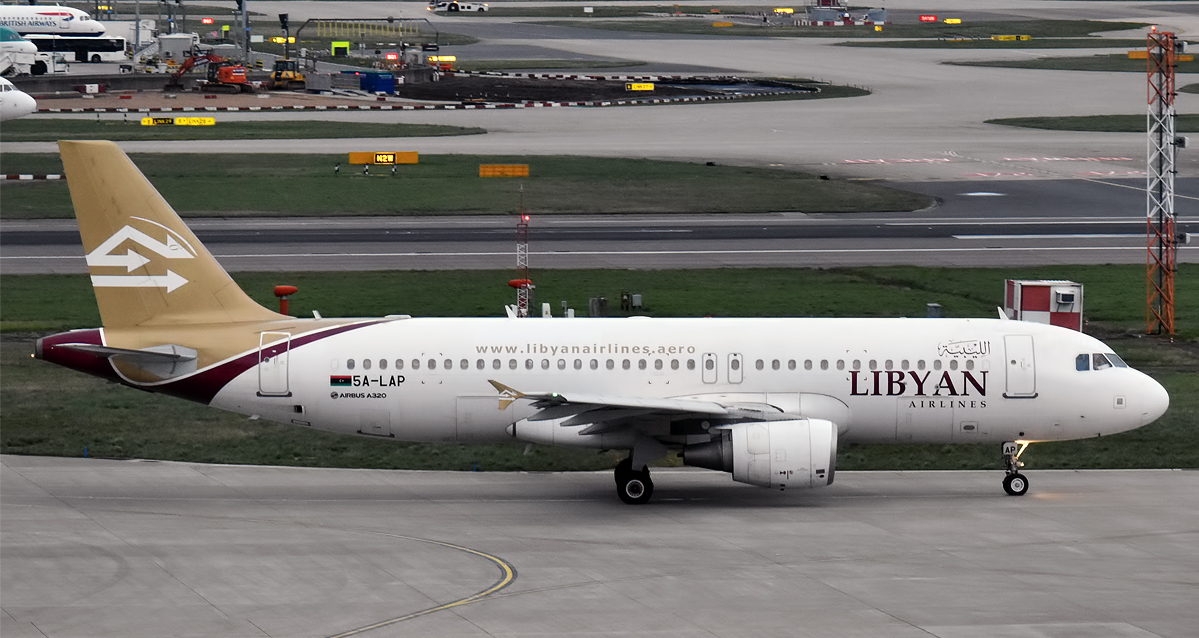
- Libyan Airlines Airbus A320-232
IATA	ICAO	Call sign
LN	LAA	LIBYAN
- Founded: September 1964; 62 years ago
- Commenced operations: August 1965; 61 years ago
- Hubs: Tripoli International Airport
- Focus cities: Benina International Airport
- Fleet size: 4
- Destinations: 22
- Parent company: Libyan African Aviation Holding Co (since 2007)
- Headquarters: Tripoli, Libya
- Website: http://www.libyanairlines.aero

Libyan Airlines, (Note: Arabic: الخطوط الجوية الليبية; transliterated: al-Khutut al-Jawiyah al-Libiyah) formerly known as Libyan Arab Airlines over several decades, is the flag carrier of Libya. Based in Tripoli, it operates scheduled passenger and cargo services within Libya and to Europe, North Africa and the Middle East, the majority of which leave from Tripoli International Airport. Benina International Airport in Benghazi serves as a secondary base. Libyan Airlines also operates Hajj services. The company is wholly owned by the government of Libya.

== History ==
=== Early years ===
The original logo of Kingdom of Libya Airlines (1964–1970).

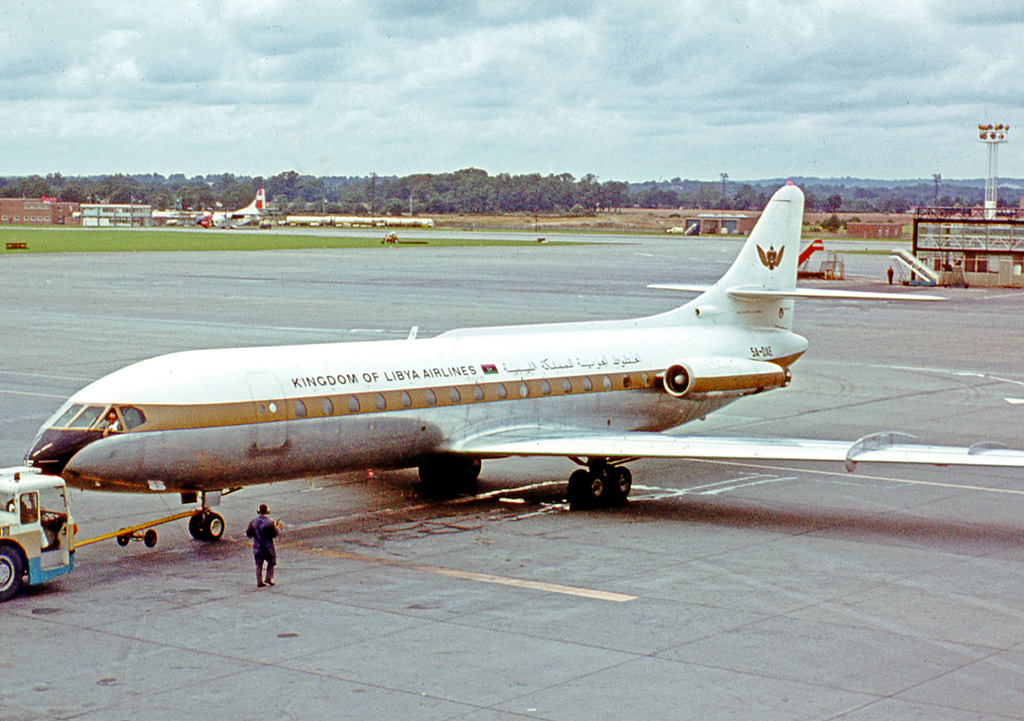
A Sud Caravelle of the Kingdom of Libya Airlines at London Gatwick in 1969.

The carrier traces its roots back to September 1964 when Kingdom of Libya Airlines was set up in conformity with law no. 22. The airline was government-owned, having an initial investment of LYD 2 million. It began operations in August 1965, flying regional routes with Sud SE-210 Caravelle aircraft. Following the carrier starting services along the Tripoli–Benghazi run, the Libyans prevented foreign companies that also flew the route from operating there in order to allow the national airline to expand. Absorbing Libavia and United Libya Airlines operations, international flights radiating from Benghazi and Tripoli began in October 1965, initially serving Athens, Cairo, London, Malta, Paris, Rome and Tunis.

The early years saw Air France providing the company with technical assistance, KLM managing the sales and reservations, and BOAC taking care of traffic, finance and communications. In March 1966, the airline and ATI struck an agreement for the lease of Fokker F27 aircraft to cover short-haul routes, with the agreement coming into effect on 15 June the same year. A third Caravelle was ordered in 1968. That year, a study to increase the airline's productivity was carried out by TWA, concluding that operating with five three-engined, 138-seater jet aircraft, and four propeller-powered 60-seater aircraft would be the most suitable choice. The report concluded that the lease of the turboprop F-27s was too costly, and the airline decided to acquire two new aircraft from Fokker in 1969. Regarding the jet aircraft, the Boeing 727 and the Trident were the only options.

=== From the Libyan revolution (1969) to the Libyan Civil War (2011) ===
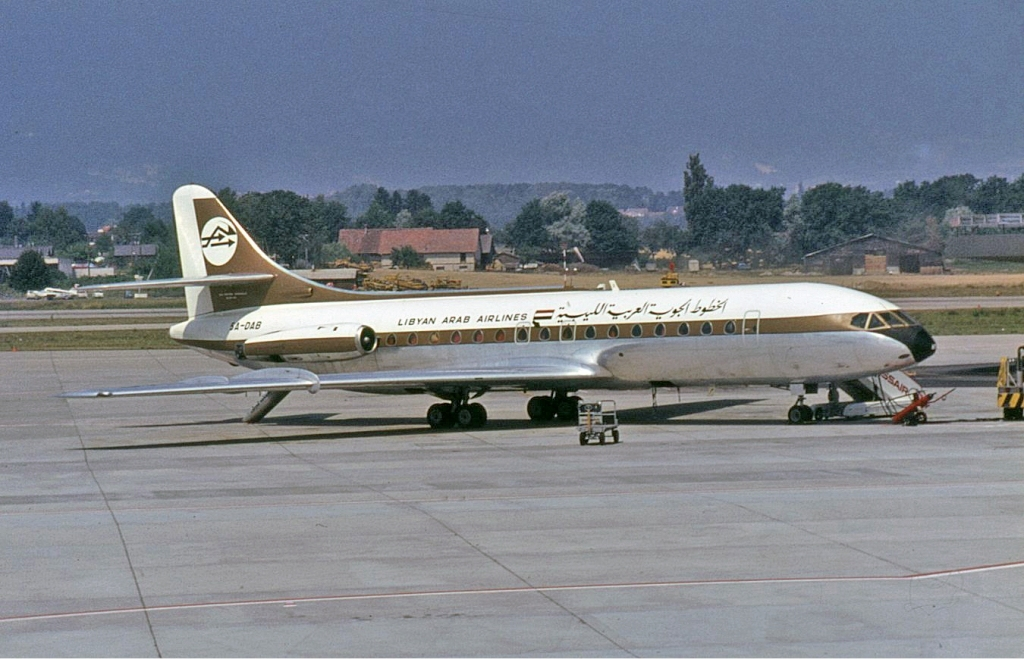
A Libyan Arab Airlines Sud Aviation Caravelle at Geneva International Airport (1971).

Following the 1969 coup d'état, the airline was renamed Libyan Arab Airlines, or Jamahiriya Libyan Air Lines, on 1 September that year. The company suspended its operations for two weeks after the coup. With Beirut and Geneva already being part of the route network by March 1970, nine international destinations were already served. In August 1970, Libyan Arab Airlines ordered two Boeing 727-200s for US$14 million. These two aircraft were part of the fleet by May 1971, along with three Caravelles and two Fokker F27s. Six Fokker F27s—four Mk600s and two Mk400s—were purchased in April 1974, and in May the same year, three additional Boeing 727-200s were ordered, aimed at replacing the Caravelles. In 1975, Libyan Arab Airlines was made the only operator within the country. Furthermore, the government committed to cancel their debts with the company on a monthly basis, and any losses the airline would incur should be compensated by the state. Also in 1975, the six F27s ordered the previous year were delivered, and the three-strong Boeing 727 order was partly fulfilled when two of these aircraft were incorporated into the fleet. By April 1976, there were 12 aircraft in the fleet, including four Boeing 727s, four Fokker F27-600s, two Fokker F27-400s, and two Falcon 20s; a Boeing 727-200 and a Boeing 737 were pending delivery. Two more Boeing 727s were acquired in May 1976; in August that year, the carrier took delivery of a Boeing 707-320C to be used by the government. The airline had 1,800 employees at April 1977; at this time, passenger and cargo flights radiating from Benghazi, Tripoli and Sebha to Athens, Algiers, Beirut, Cairo, Casablanca, Damascus, Jeddah, Khartoum, London, Malta, Paris, Rome, Tunis and Zürich were operated. During the year, the Tripoli–Frankfurt–Athens–Tunis–Casablanca and Benghazi–Rome–London routes were launched.

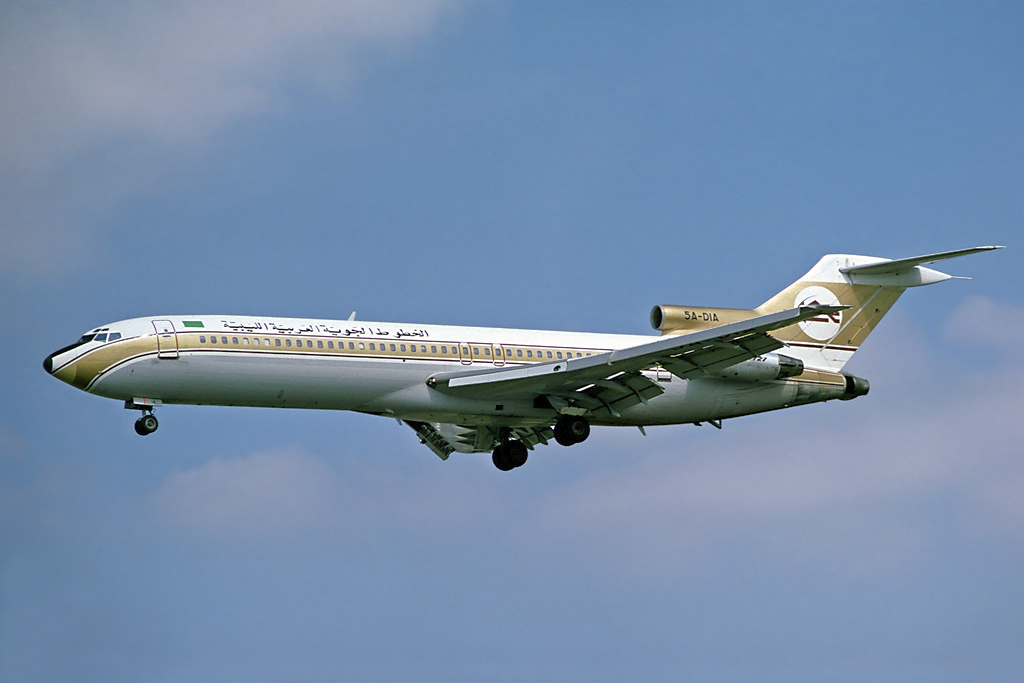
A Libyan Arab Airlines Boeing 727-200 Advanced in 1978. This aircraft would crash as Libyan Arab Airlines Flight 1103

The handover of two Boeing 727-200 Advanced aircraft, due to be delivered in June and July 1978, was blocked due to concerns that Libya was supporting terrorism. Despite the US State Department initially authorising the acquisition of three Boeing 747s and two Boeing 727s in March the following year, the transaction was blocked in mid-1979 over concerns the Libyan government would use the aircraft to transport military material and personnel, as there were suspicions that Libya played a role in the deposition of Idi Amin in Uganda. Also in 1979, a cargo subsidiary named Libyan Arab Air Cargo was set up. During the year, Madrid, Moscow, Sofia and Warsaw were included in the airline's list of destinations.

By mid-1980, the number of employees had grown to 2,500, and Amman, Belgrade, Cotonou, Istanbul and Niamey were added to the route network; later that year, Karachi was incorporated as a destination. In May 1981 Libyan Arab Airlines ordered eight 44-seater Fokker F27-600s in a deal worth more than £17 million. Ten Airbuses—six A300s and four A310s—were ordered in October the same year. At that time, Airbuses were equipped either with General Electric (GE) or Pratt & Whitney (P&W) powerplants, but the airline ordered Rolls-Royce engines to power them—something that had not been done before, as the former two were manufactured in the United States. There was a ban in force on providing Libya with technology that could possibly have military uses. The order was at least partly cancelled by Airbus, as neither GE nor P&W would provide the engines for the four A310s in the order book.

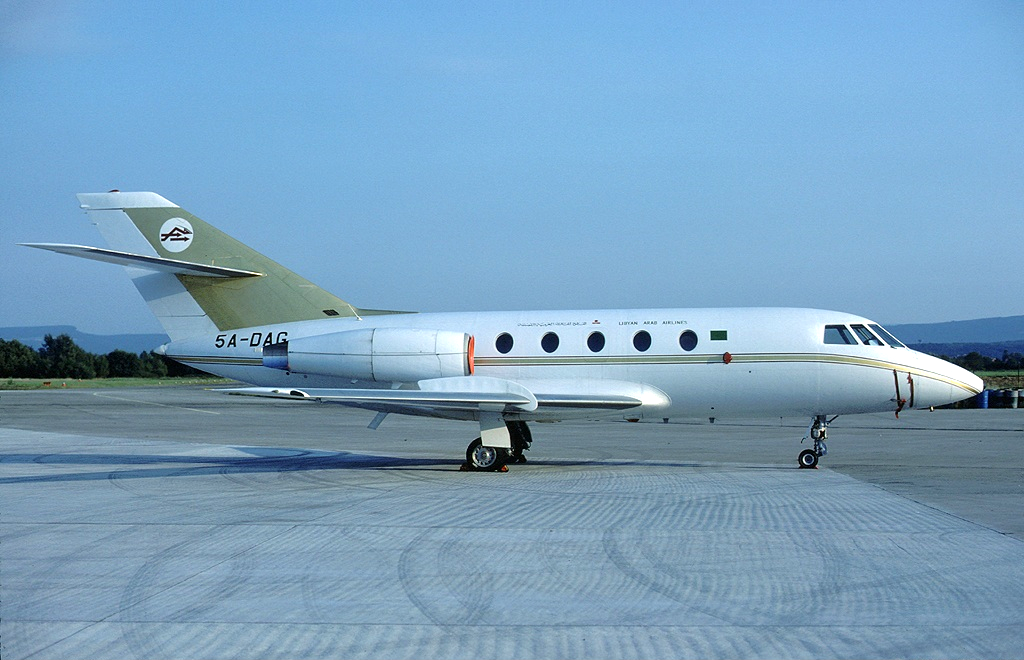
A Libyan Arab Airlines Mystère/Falcon 20C at Euroairport in 1981.

The company had managed to buy a number of ageing US-manufactured jets, including Boeing 707s and Douglas DC-8s, since 1979; many of them were either cannibalised for spare parts or sold. Three Fokker F28-4000s were bought from Fokker in 1984. At March 1985, the fleet consisted of four Boeing 707s—two -320Bs and two -320Cs—10 Boeing 727-200s, 17 F27s—two -400s, one -500 and 14 -600s—and three Fokker F28-4000s. Employment at this time was 4,500; destinations served included Algiers, Amman, Amsterdam, Athens, Belgrade, Benghazi, Bucharest, Casablanca, Damascus, Frankfurt, Istanbul, Jeddah, Karachi, Kuwait, Larnaca, London, Madrid, Malta, Milan, Moscow, Paris, Rome, Sebha, Sfax, Sofia, Tripoli, Tunis, Vienna, Warsaw and Zürich, along with an extensive domestic network. However, the airline had to cut most of its international services that year due to a US embargo imposed on the country. In 1986, six more F27-600s were phased in. During the year, Libyan Arab managed to bypass the US economic embargo against the country when the carrier acquired, through intermediary companies, ex-British Caledonian GE-powered A310 aircraft for US$105 million. Owing to both the lack of spare parts and the inability of Libyan Arab to service the GE engines, the airline sold these two aircraft to Air Algérie in 1987; in practice, the aircraft were not sold but leased, and the Algerian airline would have operated these two aircraft on Libyan Arab's behalf, but they later rolled back their decision amid concerns that the United States would take action against Air Algérie, and the two A310s were returned to Libya. Finally, British Caledonian was fined US$1 million (£600,000) for its involvement in the deal, and Libyan Arab kept both aircraft, with Swissair training Libyan crews in order to fly them. Unable to order Western-built aircraft, the airline moved to Soviet-made airframers, ordering three Tupolev Tu-154Ms in 1989.

At March 1990, the fleet consisted of five Boeing 707-320Cs, ten Boeing 727-200s, three Fokker F28-4000s, 16 Fokker F27s (13 -600s, two -500s and one -400), four Lockheed L-100-200s, 21 Ilyushin Il-76s and five Twin Otters. Another drawback hit the carrier following the March 1992 United Nations Security Council Resolution 748, adopted as a consequence of the Libyan government allegedly having supported the terrorists responsible for the bombings of Pan Am Flight 103 and UTA Flight 772. The resolution saw a trade embargo imposed on Libya, which included the delivery of new aircraft or spare parts that could possibly boost the military capacity of the country, and Libyan Airlines was denied any landing or overflight rights of third-party countries. Thus, all international flights came to an end, and LAA could only operate on domestic routes.

The Libyan Arab Airlines logo, which was used until 2006.

In April 1999, civil sanctions against the country were lifted. It followed Libya handing over two men suspected of being involved in the Lockerbie bombing. Intended to replace an ageing fleet of Boeing 707s, 727s and Fokker F27s, a letter of intent worth US$1.5 billion was signed with Airbus in October that year; it included Airbus A320s, A330s and A340s. The fact that these aircraft had US-manufactured parts once again prevented the deal to be firmed up as a trade embargo over the country, imposed in 1983, was still in force, and Libyan Arab Airlines sought alternative manufacturers to acquire new aircraft for re-fleeting. In the meantime, an Airbus A310 leased from Air Djibouti enabled Libyan Arab Airlines to expand services to the Middle East and North Africa, and Airbus A320s were on wet-lease from TransAer. Amman became the first non-domestic destination to be served again. Fleet and route network grew further when regional carrier Air Jamahiriya was merged into Libyan Arab Airlines in 2001. In 2006, the airline was renamed Libyan Airlines. The airline pursues an expansion policy, which is concentrated on European business and tourist customers. Newly introduced destinations like Milan, Ankara, Athens and Madrid have led to a route network similar to the one offered prior to the 1992 trade embargo.

=== Libyan Civil War – onwards ===
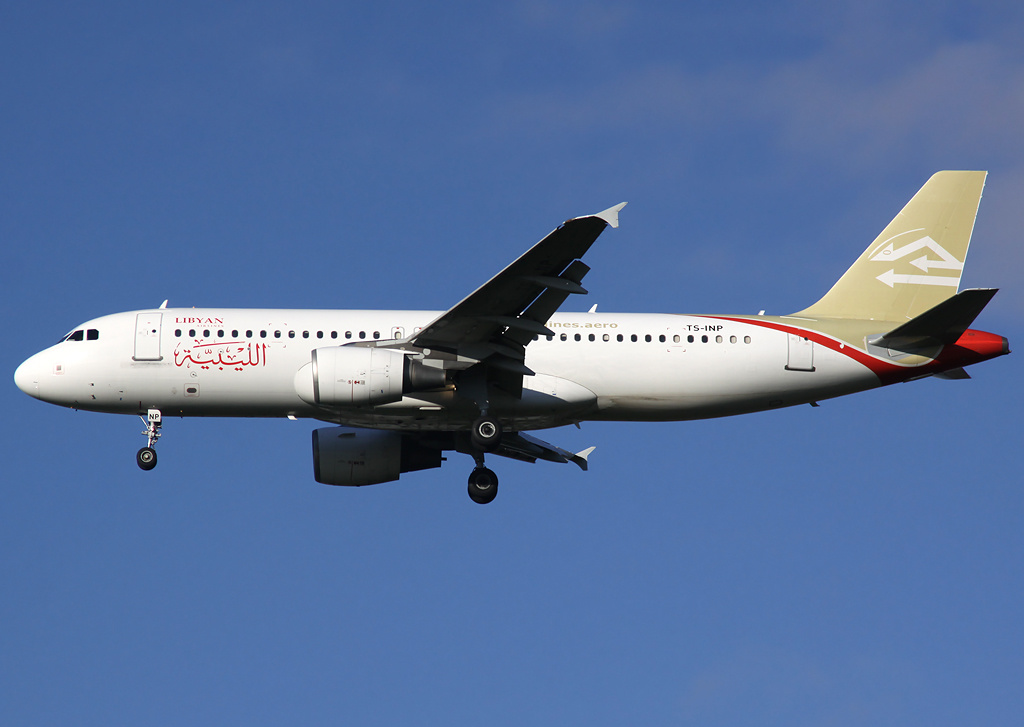
A Tunisian-registered Airbus A320-200 wearing the Libyan Airlines livery in 2012. The airline wet-leased this type of aircraft from Nouvelair in order to serve European destinations during the ban.

As a consequence of the Libyan Civil War and the resulting no-fly zone over the country enforced by NATO in accordance with the United Nations Security Council Resolution 1973, all flight operations with Libyan Airlines were terminated on 17 March 2011. The airline restarted operations in October the same year flying the Tripoli–Cairo route.

In April 2012, Libyan Airlines was affected by a ban that was imposed by the European Union (EU) on all carriers having an operator's certificate issued in Libya from flying into the member countries. The airline was removed from the list of air carriers banned in the EU in December the same year, as well as from the subsequent list released in July 2013. Despite this, as of July 2013 Libyan Airlines served the European market with wet-leased aircraft due to the Libyan Civil Aviation Authority (LYCAA) voluntarily opting for a ban until Libyan crews become re-certified. The voluntary ban will continue through 2014. No Libyan carriers have been included in the December 2013 version of the list of airlines banned in the EU. Despite information regarding LYCAA's failure for meeting international safety standards that may lead to an effective ban, as of March 2014 an agreement between Libyan authorities and the EU to lift the ban seemed plausible to take effect by mid-2014. However, in December that year all air carriers having an operator's certificate issued in Libya have been either banned or subject to restrictions in their operations into European airspace.

== Corporate affairs ==
=== Ownership and structure ===
The company is 100% owned by the government of Libya. Since 31 July 2007, Libyan Airlines has been a subsidiary of the state-owned Libyan Afriqiyah Aviation Holding Company (LAAHC), together with Afriqiyah Airways.

As of July 2013, the CEO position was held by Khaled Ben Alewa.

=== Business trends ===
Annual reports for the airline do not appear to be published. In the absence of these, the main sources for trends are press and industry reports.

	2008	2009	2010	2011	2012
Turnover (US$ m)					
Profits (US$ m)					
Number of passengers (m)					1.2
Number of aircraft (at year end)				6	
Notes/sources					

=== Proposed merger with Afriqiyah Airways ===
On 31 July 2007, Libyan Airlines became a subsidiary of the state owned Libyan Afriqiyah Aviation Holding Company (LAAHC), together with Afriqiyah Airways. LAAHC is owned by the Libyan National Social Fund (30%), the Libyan National Investment Company (30%), the Libya-Africa Investment Fund (25%), and the Libyan Foreign Investment Company (15%). On 21 September 2010, it was announced that the two airlines, which had already begun extensive code-sharing and set up joint ground handling, maintenance and catering services, were to merge by November of that year, which was later postponed indefinitely, though.

The proposed privatisation and merger with Afriqiyah Airways has also been postponed, despite the fact it was originally planned to be effective in November 2010. The two carriers were later expected to merge in late 2011, however the Arab Spring and poor organisation forced this deal to be postponed many more times. Both airlines are to merge by the first half of 2013, according to Libya's current Interim Transport Minister Yousef el-Uheshi – 12 to 13 months after negotiations are expected to resume in March 2012. The successful merging of the carriers depends on the government's ability to cut costs in both workforce and salaries, which rival European carriers in size.

== Fleet ==
=== Current fleet ===
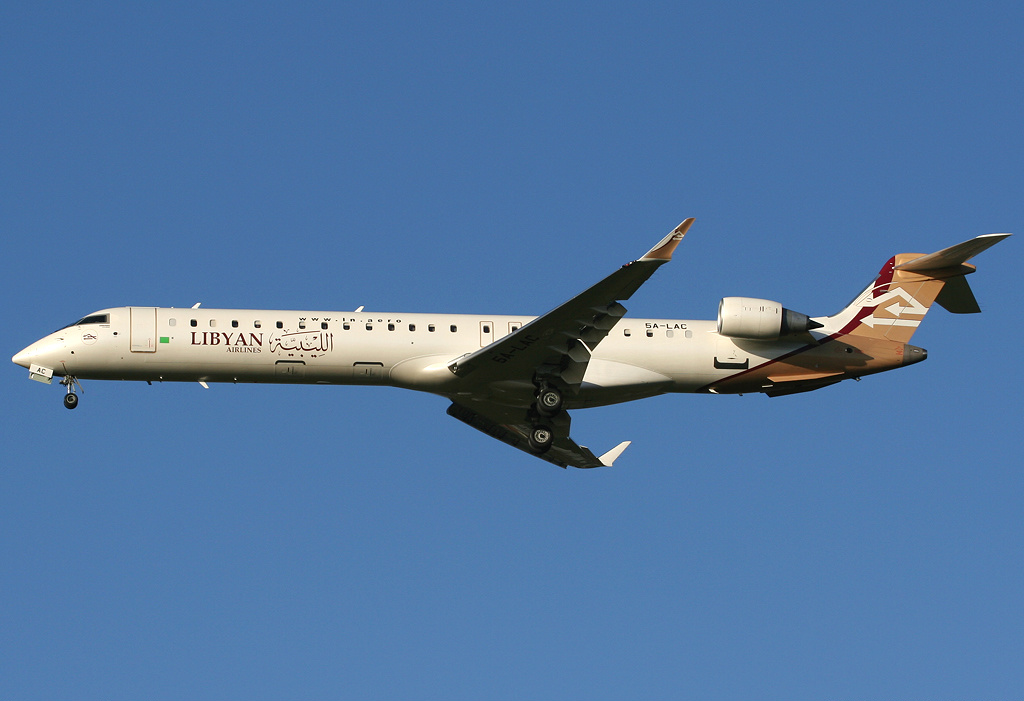
A Libyan Airlines CRJ-900 in 2008.

As of July 2026, Libyan Airlines operates the following aircraft:

Libyan Airlines fleet
Aircraft	In fleet	Orders	Passengers			Notes
Aircraft	In fleet	Orders	J	Y	Total	Notes
Airbus A320	2	—	12	156	168	
Airbus A330-200	2	—	24	235	259	
Airbus A350-900	—	6	TBA			
Total	4	6				

=== Fleet development ===
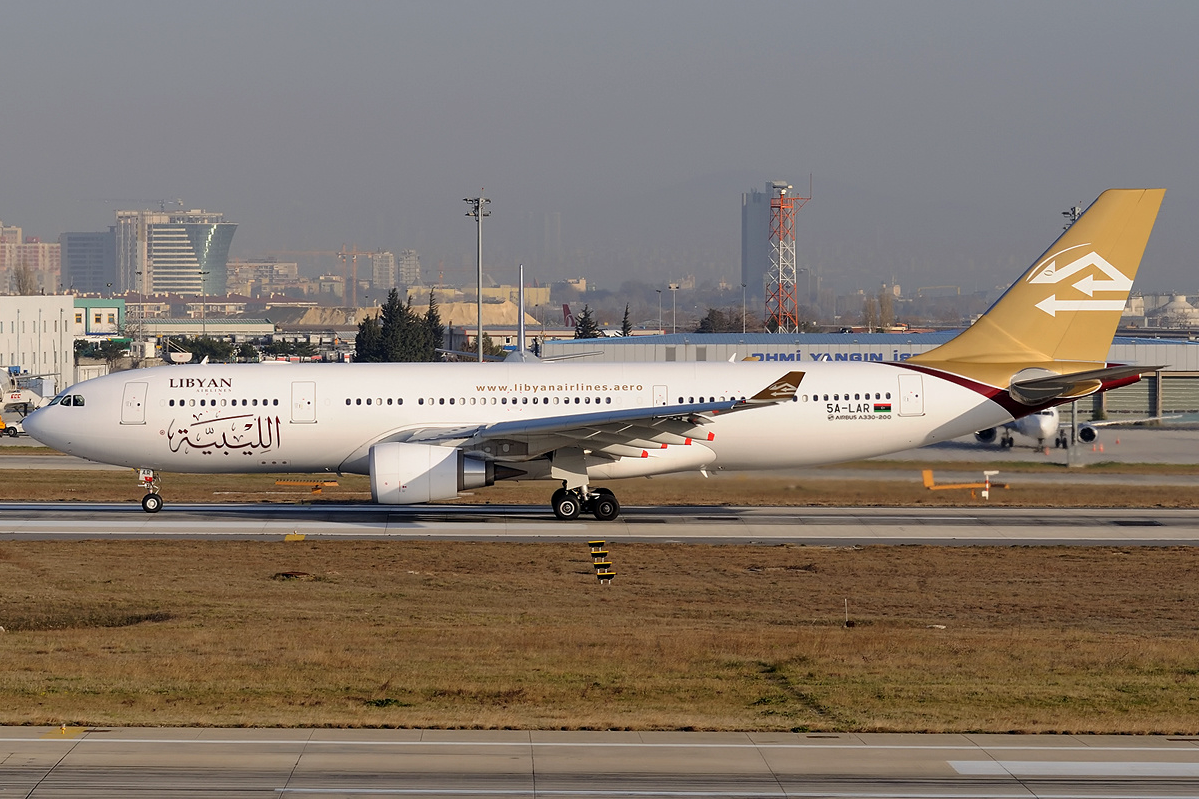
A Libyan Airlines Airbus A330-200 taxiing at Istanbul Atatürk Airport in 2013.

In order to modernize and expand its fleet, Libyan Airlines placed several orders with aircraft manufacturers. In June 2007, at the Paris Air Show, the carrier signed a memorandum of understanding (MOU) with Airbus for 15 new aircraft, including four Airbus A350-800s, four Airbus A330-200s and seven A320s; the MOU was converted into a firm order in December the same year, in a deal valued at around US$2 billion. Also in June 2007, Libyan Airlines placed an order for three Bombardier CRJ-900s worth US$108 million, and took option for another two aircraft of the type; for an approximate value of US$76 million, this option was exercised in January 2008. That month, an order for four Airbus A350-800s was placed.

In September 2010, Libyan Airlines took delivery of the first of seven Airbus A320s ordered in 2007. In October 2010, with five CRJ-900s already in operation, three more aircraft of the type were ordered for US$131.5 million, and three more were taken on option. In late June 2013, the carrier took delivery of the first Airbus A330, becoming a new customer for the type. A second A330 was phased in a month later. In January 2014, the A350-800 order was switched to the -900 model, with the addition of two more aircraft of the larger variant.

=== Damaged aircraft during the Libyan conflict ===
In July 2014, amid the 2014 Libyan conflict, clashes between antagonistic forces that tried to gain control of Tripoli International Airport damaged or destroyed a number of aircraft parked at the airport, including ones belonging to Afriqiyah Airways and Libyan Airlines. In particular, seven Libyan Airlines aircraft resulted damaged during shelling. In December 2014, the European union banned all Libyan Airlines (along with 6 other Libyan airlines) flights within European skies, citing the ongoing conflicts as a major security threat.

=== Former fleet ===
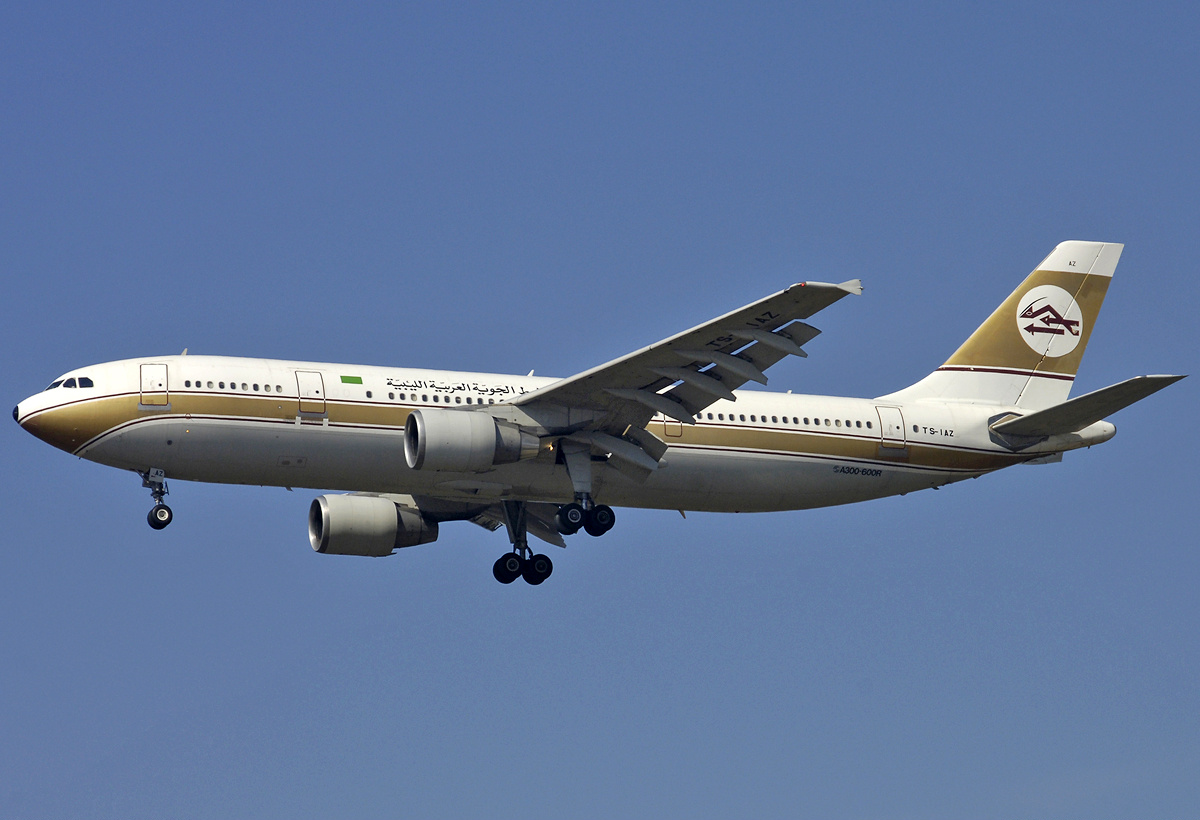
A Libyan Arab Airlines Airbus A300-600R in 2006.

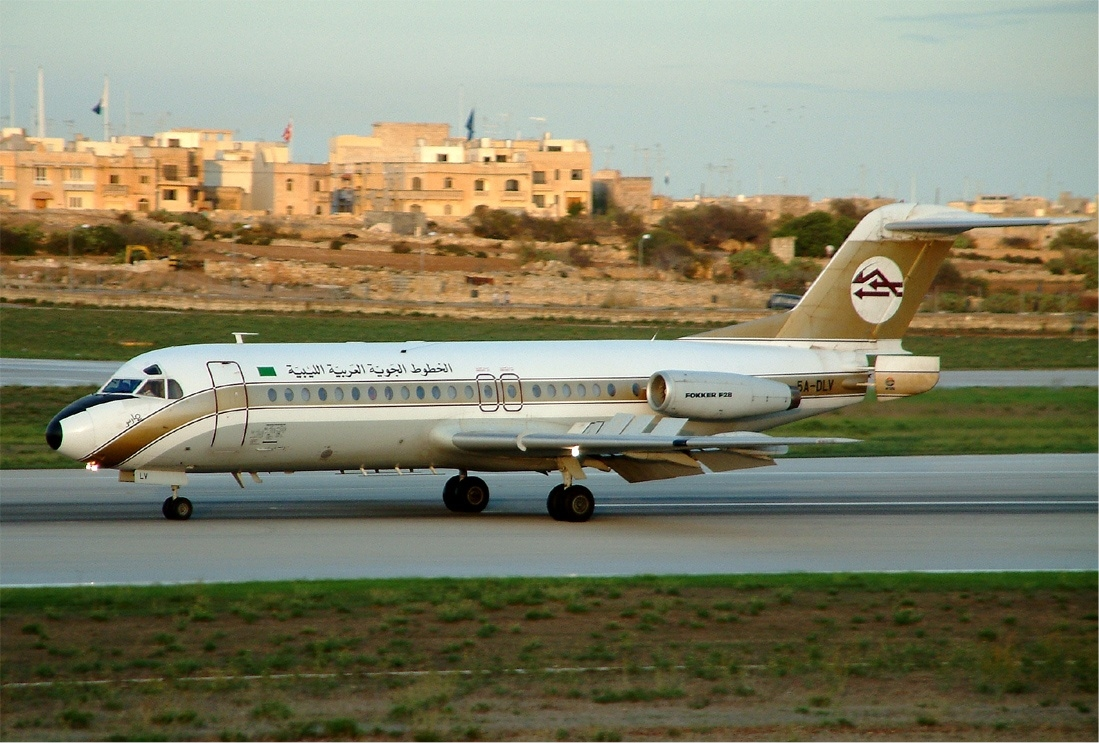
A Libyan Arab Airlines Fokker F28 Fellowship at Malta International Airport (2002).

As of August 2025, Libyan Airlines operated 3 Airbus A320 and 2 Airbus A330-200.

Over the years, the company also operated the following aircraft types:

Aircraft	Introduced	Retired
Airbus A300	1991	2011
Airbus A310	1986	2007
Airbus A320	1999	
ATR 42-500	2009	
Boeing 707		
Boeing 720		
Boeing 727		
Boeing 737-200	1979	1981
Boeing 747-200	1980	2004
Bombardier CRJ900	2007	
Douglas DC-8	1978	1980
Fokker F27 Friendship		
Fokker F28 Fellowship		
Fokker 100	1990	1994
Handley Page Dart Herald		
Ilyushin Il-76		
Lockheed L-100 Hercules		
Lockheed L-1011 TriStar		
Sud Aviation Caravelle		
Tupolev Tu-154		

== Incidents and accidents ==
=== Fatal accidents ===
- On 21 February 1973 at around 14:10 local time, Libyan Arab Airlines Flight 114 from Tripoli to Cairo, which was operated by a Boeing 727-200 (registered 5A-DAH), was shot down by Israeli fighter aircraft because it was thought to be a foreign military attack aircraft. Among the 113 people on board, only one crew member and four passengers survived the subsequent crash-landing in the desert near Ismaïlia.
- On 2 December 1977, a Tupolev Tu-154 (registered LZ-BTN), which was chartered by Libyan Arab Airlines from Balkan Bulgarian Airlines to operate a Hajj flight from Jeddah to Benghazi crashed near Benina International Airport because of fuel exhaustion. The aircraft had been circling the airport because it could not land due to dense fog, and an alternate landing strip could not be reached in time. 59 of the 159 passengers died in the accident, whilst all six crew members survived.
- On 22 December 1992, Libyan Arab Airlines Flight 1103, a Boeing 727-200 registered 5A-DIA, disintegrated on approach to Tripoli International Airport. The official government story was that it had collided with a Mikoyan-Gurevich MiG-23 of the Libyan Air Force over Tripoli. Both aircraft crashed, killing all 159 persons on board the Boeing but the 2 crew of the air force jet ejected safely, making it the worst accident in the history of the airline.

=== Non-fatal incidents ===
- On 28 November 1981, a Libyan Arab Airlines Fokker F27 Friendship (registered 5A-DBE) was damaged beyond repair in a forced landing in the desert near Kufra, which had become necessary because the aircraft had run out of fuel.
- On 6 June 1989, an LAA Fokker F27 (registered 5A-DDV) experienced an engine failure shortly after take-off from Zella Airfield for a flight to Tripoli. The crew tried to return to the airfield, but had to execute a forced landing in the desert instead, during which the aircraft was destroyed. The 36 passengers and three crew members survived the crash.
- On 7 December 1991, a Libyan Arab Airlines Boeing 707 (registered 5A-DJT) crashed on take-off at Tripoli International Airport. There were no fatalities among the 189 passengers and ten crew on board.

=== Military occurrences ===
Several aircraft of the company were destroyed on the ground in different war events:

- On 5 June 1967, during the Six-Day War, a Kingdom of Libya Airlines Learjet 23 (registered 5A-DAD), which was parked at Damascus International Airport, was destroyed in an Israeli air raid.
- On 15 April 1986, a Libyan Arab Airlines Fokker F27 Friendship (registered 5A-DLP) was destroyed at Benina International Airport during the United States bombing of the airfield as part of Operation El Dorado Canyon.
- On 25 August 2011, during the Libyan Civil War, a Libyan Airlines Airbus A300-600 (registered 5A-DLZ) was destroyed during fighting actions at Tripoli International Airport.
- On 15 July 2014, a Libyan Airlines Airbus A330 (registered 5A-LAS) suffered substantial damage in the right hand fuselage during the fighting actions at Tripoli International Airport. The aircraft is now stored for maintenance.
- On 20 July 2014, a Libyan Airlines Bombardier CRJ-900 (registered 5A-LAL) was destroyed during fighting actions at Tripoli International Airport.

=== Hijackings ===
- On 6 July 1976, an LAA Boeing 727 was hijacked during a flight from Tripoli to Benghazi and forced to land at Palma de Mallorca Airport, where the perpetrator surrendered.
- On 24 August 1979, another Boeing 727 was forced to divert from its Benghazi-Tripoli route and land at Larnaca.
- On 16 October of the same year, a domestic flight from Hun to Tripoli was hijacked by three passengers, who forced the Fokker F27 Friendship (registered 5A-DDU) to divert to Malta. After two days on the ground at Luqa Airport, the perpetrators surrendered.
- On 7 December 1981, an LAA flight from Zürich to Tripoli was hijacked by three persons who thus wanted to press prisoners free. The Boeing 727 was flown to Beirut, were the perpetrators surrendered.
- On 20 February 1983, Flight 484 was hijacked en route a flight from Sabha to Benghazi. The two hijackers forced the 727 (registered 5A-DII) to land in Malta, and surrendered three days later.
- Also in 1983, on 22 June, an LAA Boeing 707 was hijacked during a flight from Athens to Tripoli, by two persons who demanded to be taken to Iran. During the negotiations, the aircraft was flown to Rome and Larnaca, where the hijackers surrendered.

== See also ==
- Transportation in Libya

== Bibliography ==
- Guttery, Ben R. (1998). Encyclopedia of African Airlines. Jefferson, NC: McFarland & Company. ISBN 0-7864-0495-7.
