= Tehransar =

Neighbourhood in western Tehran

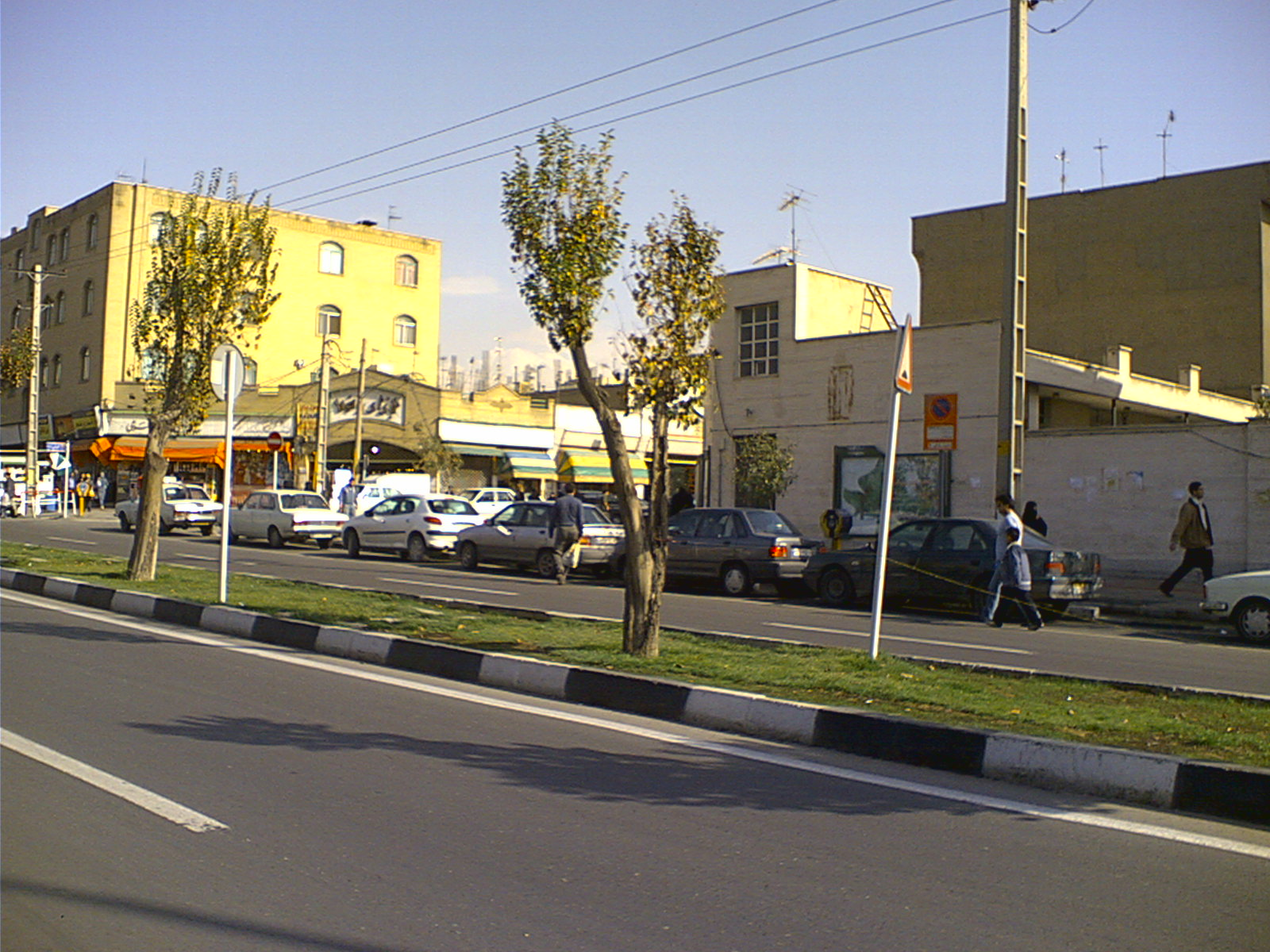
Tehranser main boulevard in 2005 A.D before the reconstruction of 14th alley

Tehransar (Persian: تهرانسر) is the name of a neighborhood in the west of Tehran, which is connected to Shahid Lashkari highway and Shahrak Azadi neighborhood from the north, Fatah highway from the south, Mehrabad airport and Asman neighborhood from the east, and Ayatollah Mahdavi Keni highway and Esteghlal neighborhood and Darya neighborhood from the west. is limited. Tehransar neighborhood used to be in the 9th district of Tehran municipality, but since 2004 it is located in the 21st district of Tehran municipality. Girl schools in Tehranser have been the subject of gas poisonings in 2023, with dozens of students taken to hospital.

== History ==
In the past, especially during the reign of the Qajar dynasty, the present Tehransar region and its surrounding areas were considered royal hunting grounds. Also, the presence of a spring around Azadegan highway (Mahdavi Keni highway) near the current Fatemeh al-Zahra town has made this area more important. At the beginning of the 13th century and during the reign of Ahmad Shah Qajar, a person named Khalil Manavi wanted to buy a spring, and upon inquiry he found out that this spring belonged to a person named Farmanfarma, a descendant of Naser al-Din Shah, Khalil Manavi paid about 13 thousand tomans for it. He bought the spring from him and built houses around it and settled several families from the people of Hamadan and Tuiserkan. There, he turns that area into a village called Sulaiman Khanah. By paying the residents of the village, he asks them to farm on the surrounding land, and by doing so, he makes himself the owner of all the areas around the spring.

It should be mentioned that in the old documents (movable) of Tehransar properties, the sentence: "from the lands of Suleiman Khana " is written.

After some time, around 1952 A.D, the oil company employees' cooperative company chose this area to build residential houses for the company's employees, and after negotiating with Manavi, it bought about one million square meters of land and started construction. The name of this area is Tehransar. And in it, he builds a number of villa houses (garden villas) with an area of about 500–600 meters and 25 shops.

In the 60s and 70s, A.D the main street of Tehransar (now Tehransar Blvd.) had a guard and an entrance gate in the northern part of the Karaj road ( now Shahid Lashgari Highway ).

In 1967, a school was built and established in Tehransar on our main street (currently Tehransar Blvd.) between the 20th street (currently Ghariban) and the 22nd street (currently Asadi), which is now called: Hajar Girls' School.

Around 1970 A.D, after 13 Aban neighborhood and Nazi Abad neighborhood, the main area of Tehransar was gassed and gassed due to the residence of the senior managers of the Ministry of Oil.

Also, in 1973 A.D, a stadium named " Doctor Eqbal Sports Stadium " was built on "BashGah e Naft" Street (now Martyr Mahmoud Khosrow Parviz), and it was opened on Friday, November 16, 1973 by the CEO of the National Iranian Oil Company, Dr. Manouchehr Eqbal himself. And now its name is "Sports Club of Oil Industry Employees (Tehransar)".

In addition, there is a big empty villa house in Tehranser Blvd corner of 17th Street, which the old people of Tehranser say belonged to Dr. Manouchehr Eqbal and thank God it is still there and has not been destroyed.

"Havapeymiy Keshvari" Residential Town : in 1974 A.D by the Ministry of War as organizational houses in the form of 4-story residential blocks with 3 or 4 units per floor (total of about 385 residential units of 88 to 114 meters) without parking in the building were built, this project included 24 residential complexes (blocks) and a commercial complex. This town was surrounded and limited on 4 sides, the west and east sides with concrete walls and the north and south sides with half walls and metal fences, and there were also two entrance doors and guards on the north and south sides. However, these apartments were never handed over to the employees of the Ministry of War, and after the revolution, they were seized and confiscated by the executive headquarters of Farman Imam, and they were uninhabited for a while, and in the middle of the 60s, they were transferred to the housing cooperative of Civil Aviation Organization employees.It was handed over and in the late 60's the staff settled in it. "This neighborhood is bounded from the north by 35-meter street (current Yas Boulevard), from the south by the old Karaj road ( current Haj Ahmad Motevasselian highway ), from the west by the land wall of the National Meteorological Organization, and from the east by Fajr Street." Currently, a small area of this neighborhood belongs to the civil aviation settlement, which has been named Yass Aviation Settlement, and In the 2010s, A.D "Maskan e Vijheh e Tehran" buildings were built in this area and in the vacant land of the Civil Aviation City.

"Tehransar e Sharghi" neighborhood : from 1981 A.D onwards in the barren and empty land below Tehransar (south and southeast part of the main boulevard), the land was given by the Urban Land Organization to build houses for the housing cooperative of various companies, including General factories. Saipa, Zamiad, Iran Kaveh, Yalif, Pars Khodro, Siemens and ArajAnd... it was granted and in them villa houses of about 140 to 180 meters were built and handed over to the personnel. {{{For example, by the housing cooperative of Zamiad company employees, about 100 units of 160-meter villas were built in 3 alleys. Their names have been changed to Shahid Moghdisi Alley (42), 44th Alley and 46th Alley.}}} This neighborhood includes streets such as South Naft Street, Golnaz Street (Triangle Park) and Fajr Street (Down Valley). "This neighborhood is bounded from the north by 30th Street (currently Ashuri) and 29th Street (currently Torabi), from the south to Kucheh Hastad-5th, from the west to Malik Ashtar Boulevard and the wall of the Civil Aviation Settlement, and from the east to Araj Street (boulevard current flowers) is limited." This neighborhood was supplied with gas in the early 90s A.D.

"Bonyad" Neighborhood : was also built in the 70's A.D by Mustafafan Foundation, and its houses were initially given to people covered by the foundation, and many of them still do not have documents. This neighborhood is now known as Tehransar Gharbi and is located in the southwestern area of Tehransar and "this neighborhood is from the north to West Nilofar Blvd (current Shahed Gharbi), from the south to 35 Meter Street (current Yas Blvd), from the west to the belt Azadegan ( the current Ayatollah Mahdavi Keni Highway ) and is limited to Malik Ashtar Boulevard from the east.

"Shahrak e Darya" neighborhood : was formed in 1984 A.D for the Navy and Army employees. "This neighborhood was built at the western end of Yas Boulevard and from the north to the 35-meter street (the current Yas Boulevard), from the south to the old Karaj road (the current Haj Ahmed Motevasselian highway), from the west to the Azadegan beltway (the current Ayatollah Mahdavi Keni highway). And from the east, it is limited to Marwarid Boulevard and the land wall of the country's meteorological organization.

"Pasdaran" neighborhood : was formed in the 90s A.D for police force employees. "This neighborhood is bounded from the north by Lale Boulevard, from the south by East Nilofar Boulevard (current Shahid East), from the west by North Naft Street, and from the east by Arj Street (current Golha Boulevard)."

"Shahrak e Asman" neighborhood: was formed for the employees of the Air Force. "This neighborhood is bounded by Mehrabad airport from the north, Karaj old road from the south (the current Haj Ahmad Motevasselian highway), Arj street (the current Golha boulevard) and Golha residential complexes from the west, and Mehrbad airport from the east. The new name of this town has been changed to "Shahid e Khalban Jedi Ardabili".

"Golha" residential complex neighborhood : was formed for the employees of grain organization and customs offices. This complex includes 16 residential towers. This neighborhood is bounded by Mehrbad airport from the north, Aseman town from the south and Mehrbad airport area from the west, Arj street (the current Golha Boulevard) from the west, and Aseman town from the east.

"Shahrak al-Mahdi" neighborhood : has been formed for employees of government organizations. They are built in the form of three-story apartments. This project includes 4 residential towers. "This neighborhood is limited to Mehrabad Airport from the north, Mehrabad Airport from the south, Arj Street (now Golha Boulevard) from the west, and Mehrbad Airport from the east."

"Shahrak e Kazimieh" neighborhood : was formed in the 90s A.D for the former residents of Estakhr neighborhood (Hilal Ahmar Street). "This neighborhood is limited to Golha town from the north, Mehrbad airport from the south, Arj street (now Golha boulevard) from the west, and Mehrbad airport from the east."

"Commercial Town" has been formed for the employees of Iran State Trading Company. "This neighborhood is limited to the Literacy Movement Organization and Karaj Special Road ( current Shahid Lashgari Highway) from the north, to the 9th Street from the south, to the 6th Boulevard from the west, and to Araj Street (the current Golha Boulevard) from the east."

"Shahrek e Golha" neighborhood : "This neighborhood is bounded from the north by the special road of Karaj ( the current Shahid Lashgari highway ), from the south by the town of "Shahrak e Kazimieh", from the west by Arj Street (the current Golha Boulevard) and from the east by the area of Mehrbad Airport. will be."

"Shahid HashmiNejad" neighborhood : was built in the 2010s A.D for the employees of the Islamic Revolutionary Guard Corps. This project includes 4+18 residential towers. "This neighborhood is bounded from the north by "Qobad Park" and Karaj Special Road (currently Shahid Lashgari Highway), from the south by second alley (currently Jafari), from the west by North Qobad Street, and from the east by the sixth boulevard and the commercial town."

"Maskan e Vijheh" neighborhood : was built by the government between 2013 and 2017 in the form of the National Mehr Special Housing Plan of Tehran. This project includes 231 blocks (complexes) with 6 floors and 10 units, and a total of 2310 105-meter two-bedroom residential units with parking, as well as 25 to 30 shops. "This neighborhood is on both sides of Tehransar Boulevard and from the north to the "35 meteri" street (the current Yas Boulevard), from the south to the Yas airport settlement and the old Karaj road ( the current Haj Ahmad Motevasselian highway ), from the west to the earth wall of the National Meteorological Organization. And it is limited to Fajr street from the east.

"ShahrDari" Residential Buildings Neighborhood" was built in the 2010s A.D by the 21st District Municipality of Tehran. "This neighborhood is from the north to Karaj special road ( the current Shahid Lashgari highway ), from the south to the 21st district municipality and 1st street (the current Rasakh Mehr), from the west to the Azadgan beltway ( the current Ayatollah Mahdavi Keni highway ) and from the east to Tehransar Blvd. And the Tehransar area (the current Kamal al-Mulk square) is limited."

== Current status [ edit ] ==
The population of Tehransar is more than 100,000 people, which due to the welfare and medical facilities, access, etc., Tehransar has become one of the neighborhoods that accept immigrants, and its population is increasing.

Tehransar has been selected as one of Tehran's neighborhoods for the implementation of Tehran's special housing plan, and the construction of 2,310 special housing units in Yas Boulevard on the south side of this area has started since 2011. Currently, half of the residential units of the town have been available to the owners since 2015, and the second phase of the project, which includes the other half of the residential units and the entertainment complex and the amusement park, as well as the commercial units and the transfer plan of the Lale Zar market, is progressing at a good pace. It is under construction.

Tehransar is home to some of the richest companies in Tehran, such as Iran Khodro, Saipa, Pars Khodro, Araj, Kerman Khodro, Shahab Khodro, Iran Tire, Mino Industrial Group, Darogar, Pars Electric and Darupakhsh.

== Transferring the subway to Tehransar [ edit ] ==
On July 19, 2017, following the visit of the mayor of Tehran and the chairman of the city council to District 21, Mohsen Hashemi, the head of the city council at the time, announced the arrival of Tehran subway line 4 from Shahrek Ekbatan metro station to Tehransar. However, after the unveiling of four new metro lines, it became clear that two stations are planned for Tehransar neighborhood on line 11 of the Tehran Metro. which starts from Chogan Boulevard in District 22 and will enter District 18 after passing District 21 and two stations in Tehransar.

== Mosques and cultural buildings [ edit ] ==
- Rasool Akram Mosque - West Shahid Blvd., corner of Rajaee St
- Sahib Al Zaman Mosque - Tehransar main boulevard, 2nd street (currently Demirchilo street)
- Al-Nabi Mosque - Pasdaran Town, Talebi St
- Mohseni Mosque - Yas Boulevard, Fajr Street
- Imam Mahdi Mosque - Yas Boulevard, South Naft Street
- Al-Ghadir Mosque - Darya Town, Arvand Roud Blvd
- Imam Khomeini Mosque - Airport Town
- Golzar Shohada Anhomesh - located in Golriz Park (now Park of Unknown Martyrs) on East Niloufer Boulevard (currently East Shahid Boulevard)
- Phoenix think tank - North Tehran

== Entertainment centers [ edit ] ==
- Narges Park - Tehransar main boulevard, Kamal al-Mulk square
- Golnaz Park (Triangle Park) - Tehransar main boulevard, below Sadaf intersection
- Golriz Park (currently Unknown Martyrs' Park) - Eastern Niloufer Boulevard (currently Eastern Shahid Boulevard)
- Ghobad Park - Karaj Special Road ( now Shahid Lashgari Highway ), after Ghobad Street
- Rais Ali Delvari Park - Karaj Special Road ( now Shahid Lashgari Highway ), not reaching Qobad Street
- Rima Park - Trading town
- Laleh Park - Shahid Rajaei Street, West Tehranser
- Bahar Park - West Tehranser, West Yas Blvd
- Sepid Park - Tehransar main boulevard, 4th street
- Arghwani Park - Tehransar East, North Banafshe St
- Nilofer Park - West Nilofer Boulevard (now West Shahid Boulevard), Azadegan Beltway Corner ( now Ayatollah Mahdavi Keni Highway )
- Servanaz Park - Darya town, Azadegan beltway corner ( current Ayatollah Mahdavi Keni highway )
- Golha Park - Golha Boulevard
- GolHay e Bahari Park - Golha Boulevard
- Fajr Park (Fajr Street)
- Bidgol Athena Park - Yas Blvd., Fajr St
- Kausar Park (martyr Asgharnia) - Yas Boulevard, at the end of Fajr Street
- Golmohammadi Park - Yas Boulevard, Golmohammadi St
- Hazrat Zahra (S) Park - Yas Boulevard, special housing
- Marwarid Park - Darya town, Marwarid St
- Shahrak Darya Park - Shahrak Darya, Arvand Roud Blvd
- Shakiba Park - Darya town, Sadaf Blvd
- Negin Park - Tehransar main boulevard, corner of 4th street
- Various small gardens
- Phoenix Cinema (now turned into a library)
- Amphitheater West Tehranser (Sarai Yas) - West Nilofar Blvd (current West Shahid Blvd), corner of Azadegan Beltway ( current Ayatollah Mahdavi Keni Highway )
- Toy house
- Almas amusement park - Lale Boulevard, after the intersection of Qabad St
- Sports Club of Oil Industry Employees - Naft Club St. (now Khosro Parviz)
- Yas Sports Complex - Yas Blvd., South Naft St., 49th St. (now Shahid Sabz Puri St.)
- Shahrak Darya Sports Complex - Shahrak Darya, Arvand Roud Blvd
- Fatah sports complex - Tehransar main boulevard, Kamal al-Mulk square
- Houdin and Horam Recreational Sports Complex - Golha Blvd
- Positive Energy Sports Complex - Tehransar Main Blvd., Kamal Al-Mulk Square
- TSC Tehransar Sports Complex - Yas Blvd., Golmohammadi St
- New Fizik Sports Complex - Tehransar Main Blvd., 14th St.
- Kowsar Tehransar cultural and sports complex - Pasdaran settlement, Talebi St., underground of Al-Nabi Mosque
- Tolo Sports Complex - Yas Blvd., South Naft St., underground of Imam Mahdi Mosque
- Abdallah Haddad Sports Complex - West Niloufar Blvd (current Shahed West), corner of Rajaee St., underground of Jame Rasool Akram Mosque
- Artificial grass field - Golha boulevard, below Golha Park
- Artificial grass field - Yas Boulevard, Golmohammadi Street
- Watersani football field - West Niloufer Boulevard (now West Shahid Boulevard), corner of Azadegan Beltway ( now Ayatollah Mahdavi Keni Highway )
- Pishran Skating Club - Tehransar Main Blvd., Kamal Al-Mulk Square
- Soren Paintball Club
- Shahid Shujaei Pool - Golha Blvd
- Flowers Pool - Flowers Boulevard
- 14th pool - Tehransar main boulevard, 14th street (current Shahid Gate facade)
- Rahimian Pool - Tehransar main boulevard, between 9th and 11th streets (now Shahid Drodian)
- Esteghlal Pool, Tehran - Esteghlal Town, Doctor Obidi Blvd
- Shohada Ghawas pool - Esteghlal town, inside Fatemeh al-Zahra town (S)
- Traditional canteen of "Shakhe Tuba" (Current Tehranser Nights)
- Almas traditional canteen (now Closed)
- Hazardostan Traditional Canteen - Boulevard Laleh
- Traditional saffron dining room
- Fanous Dining Room - West Niloufer Blvd (Current West Shaheed)
- Fast food and night restaurants

== Health care centers [ edit ] ==
- Sahib Kausar Hospital (under completion) - at the beginning of Lale Boulevard, Shahid Jafar Tahmasabi Fard Street
- Qavamin Charity Clinic - the beginning of Lale Boulevard, Shahid Jafar Tahmasabi Fard St
- Martyr Sani Khani Clinic - Esteghlal Town, Dr. Obidi Blvd
- Karim Health Center - Tehransar West, Dastghib St
- Tehransar drug abuse treatment center ( addiction treatment )
- Driver examination center

== Important government centers [ edit ] ==
- Tehran fire station 104
- Shahid Tavakoli Communication Center (North Ghobad Street)
- 150 Tehransar police station
- Postal Service Office (Shahid Boulevard - Shahid Jafar Tahmasabi Fard Street)
- Relief Committee
- District 21 traffic department (end of Yas Blvd.)
- Municipality of District 21 (Kamal al-Mulk Square)

== Scientific centers [ edit ] ==
- Sama Technical and Vocational College (Islamic Azad University)
- Sama Faculty of Sciences (Islamic Azad University)
- Pars University of Applied Sciences
- Applied Scientific Education Center of Persepolis
- Mehrkam Pars Applied Scientific Training Center
- Center for applied scientific education of culture and art
