= Buraq Air =

Airline based in Tripoli, Libya

Buraq Air البراق

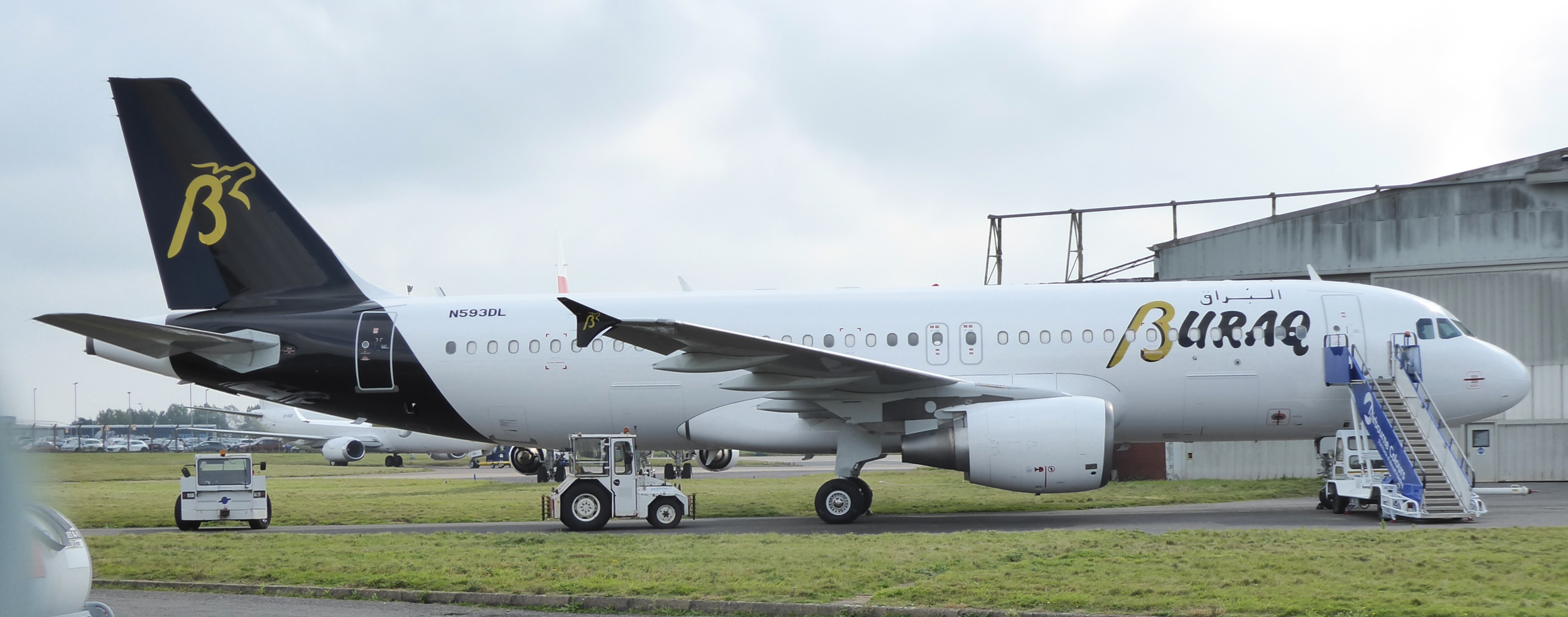
- Buraq Air Airbus A320-200
IATA	ICAO	Call sign
UZ	BRQ	BURAQAIR
- Founded: 2000
- Hubs: Mitiga International Airport
- Fleet size: 6
- Destinations: 7
- Headquarters: Tripoli, Libya
- Key people: Mohamed Bubeida (Chairman and CEO)
- Website: www.buraq.aero

Buraq Air (El-Buraq Air Transport Inc) is an airline with its headquarters on the grounds of Mitiga International Airport in Tripoli, Libya. It currently operates a minor international scheduled network and additional charter services and flights in support of CHC. The airline's base is Mitiga International Airport as the larger Tripoli International Airport has not been operational for several years. The current Chairman and CEO is Captain Mohamed Bubeida, who also serves as an active airline pilot.

== History ==
The airline was established on 22 October 2000, and started operations on 15 November 2001; it is the first privately owned airline in Libya. Its name comes from the buraq, a creature on which the Islamic prophet, Muhammad is believed to have flown from Mecca to Jerusalem, and from there to the various heavens.

As a consequence of the Libyan Civil War and the resulting no-fly zone over the country enforced by NATO in accordance with the United Nations Security Council Resolution 1973, all flight operations with Buraq Air were terminated on 17 March 2011. As of 25 August 2011, at least two Boeing 737-800 were still visible on the tarmac of Tripoli International Airport. It has since resumed operations.

Buraq Air announced in November 2025 the delivery of its sole Embraer E190, the first of its type to operate in Libya, after the aircraft landed at Benghazi International Airport on November 13, 2025.

== Destinations ==
=== Current destinations ===
As of January 2021, Buraq Air serves the following destinations:

- Antalya – Antalya Airport charter
- Bodrum – Bodrum Airport charter
- Gazipaşa – Gazipaşa Airport charter
- Istanbul – Istanbul Airport
- İzmir – İzmir Adnan Menderes Airport charter
- Tekirdağ – Tekirdağ Çorlu Airport charter
- Tripoli – Mitiga International Airport base

=== Terminated destinations ===
The following destinations were terminated in the wake of the Libyan Civil War:

- Aleppo – Aleppo International Airport
- Alexandria – Alexandria International Airport
- Cairo – Cairo International Airport
- Rabat – Rabat-Salé Airport
- Sarajevo – Sarajevo International Airport
- Tripoli – Tripoli International Airport

== Fleet ==
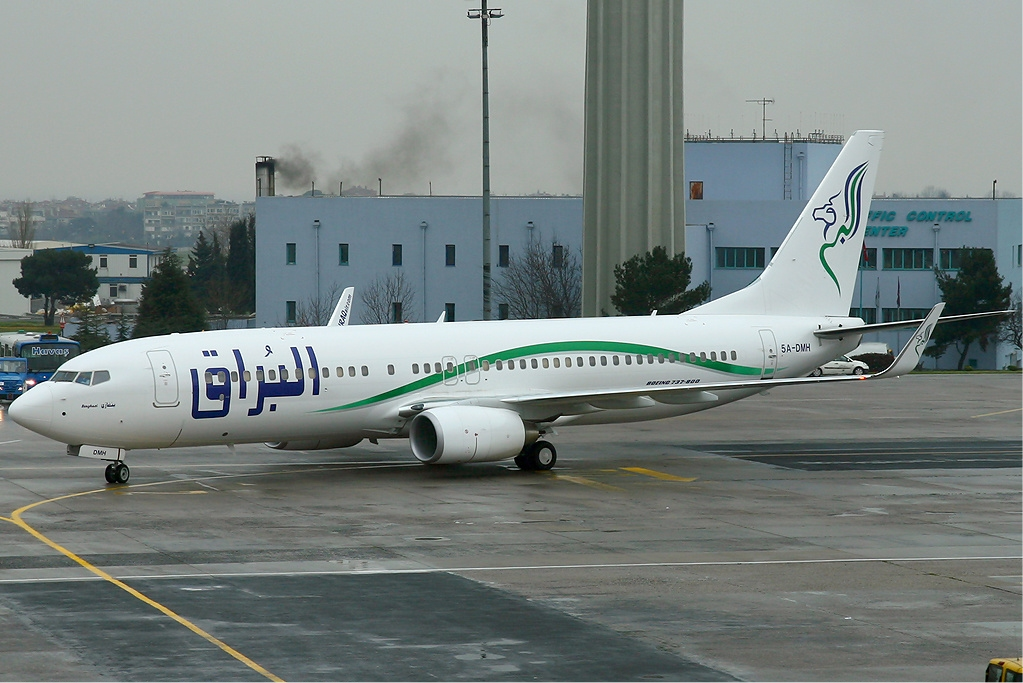
Buraq Air Boeing 737-800

As of July 2026, Buraq Air operates the following aircraft:

Buraq Air fleet
Aircraft	In service	Orders	Passengers	Notes
Airbus A320	4	—	180	
Airbus A320neo	—	10	TBA	Deliveries expected in 2031-2032
Boeing 737-800	1	—	189	
Embraer 190	1	—	100	
Total	6	10		

=== Former fleet ===
As of August 2025, Buraq Air operated 4 Airbus A320, 1 Boeing 737-400, 1 Boeing 737-800 and 1 Embraer 190.

== Accidents and incidents ==
- On 17 April 2013, a Buraq Air Boeing 737-800 was hit by gun fire while approaching Tripoli International Airport on a domestic flight from Benghazi. There were no injuries and only limited damage; the aircraft made a normal landing.
