= Ghadames Air Transport =

Ghadames Air
IATA	ICAO	Call sign
NJ	GMS	GHADAMES AIR
- Founded: 2004; 2022
- Hubs: Tripoli
- Fleet size: 2
- Website: https://ghadamesairlines.com

Ghadames Air (IATA: NJ, ICAO:GMS) is a Libyan airline based at Mitiga International Airport.

== Transporting illegal migrants ==
In July 2024, the commercial director of Ghadames Air was arrested by Libyan police. The airline was being accused of transporting hundreds of illegal migrants to Nicaragua, then these migrants head north to the USA. Earlier that year, the airlines had several Boeing 777-200 flights departed from Libya to Managua with about 400 passenger onboard.

== Destinations ==
Ghadames Air, a rebranding of Ghadames Air Transport, resumed flights in spring 2022, after a hiatus of several years.

It serves the following scheduled destinations:

- Istanbul - Istanbul Airport
- Tripoli - Mitiga International Airport base
- Tunis - Tunis Carthage Airport
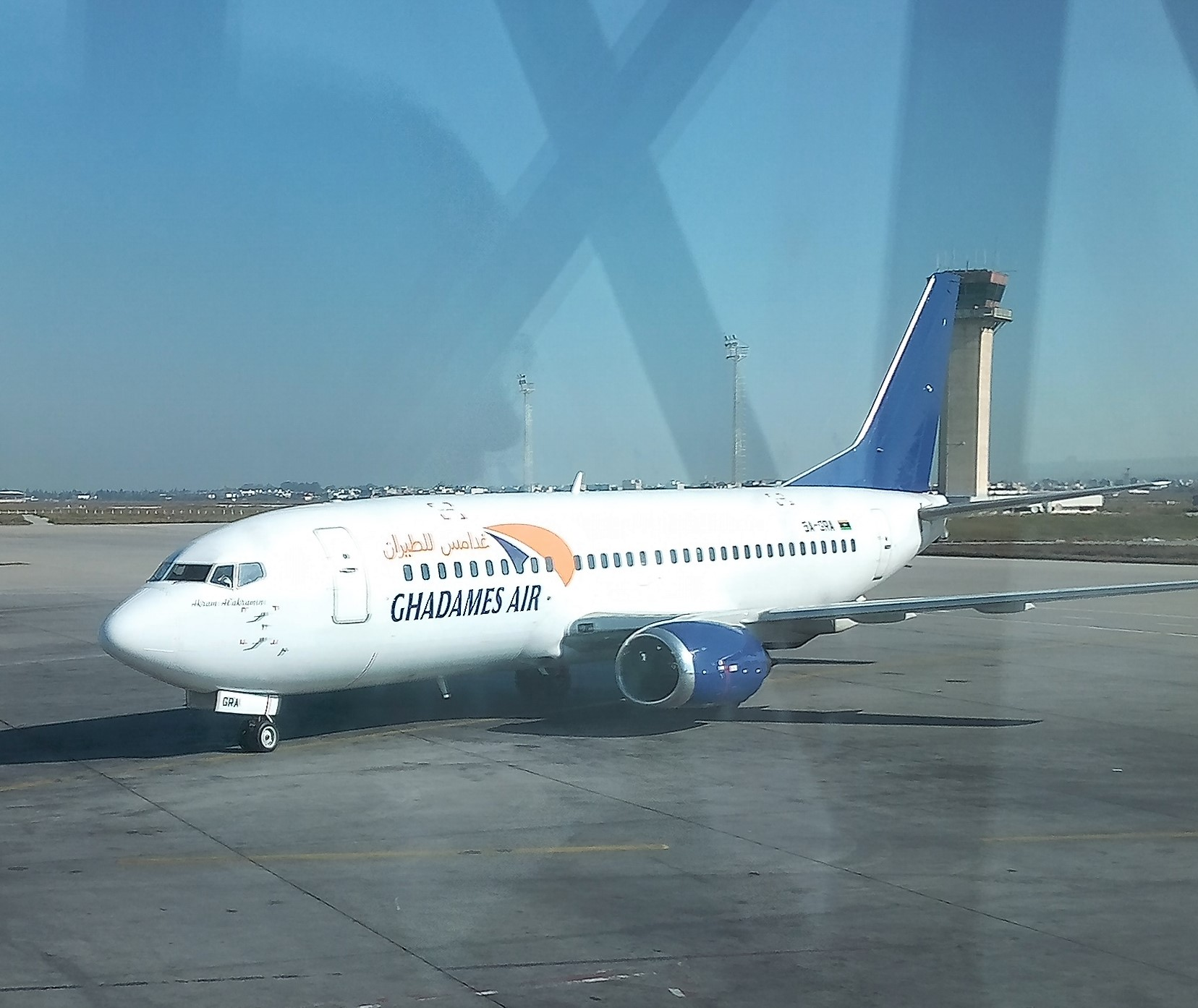
- Boeing 737 of Ghadames Air at Tunis-Carthage's airport, 2023

== Fleet ==
=== Current fleet ===
As of July 2026, Ghadames Air operates the following aircraft:

Aircraft	In service	Orders	Notes
Boeing 737-300	1	—	
Boeing 777-200ER	1	—	
Total	2	—	

=== Fleet development ===
Following the loss of its Air Operator's Certificate in 2020, Ghadames air transport sold its two derelict Airbus A320-200 and its Fokker 100 and the rebranded company bought two second-hand Boeing 737-300.

=== Former fleet ===
As of August 2025, Ghadames Air Transport operated 1 Boeing 737-300.

Ghadames Air Transport alo previously operated the following aircraft:

- 1 further Boeing 737-300
