= Free Libyan Air Force =

- القوات الجوية الليبية الحرة
- Active: March 2011 – October 2011
- Country: Libya
- Allegiance: National Transitional Council
- Branch: Air force
- Role: Aerial warfare
- Size: 3,000 volunteers 28+ aircraft 9+ Helicopters 1 UAV
- Part of: Anti-Gaddafi forces
- Headquarters: Benina Airbase, Benghazi
- Engagements: First Libyan Civil War; Battle of Ajdabiya; Second Battle of Benghazi

Commanders
- Chief of Staff: Saqr Geroushi
- Notable commanders: Colonel Abdullah El-Hassi; Colonel Ali Atiyya

Insignia
- Roundel

- Fin Flash

Aircraft flown
- Fighter: MiG-21, MiG-23
- Helicopter: CH-47 Chinook, Mil Mi-2, Mil Mi-8, Mil Mi-14, Mil Mi-17
- Attack helicopter: Mil Mi-24
- Trainer: Aero L-39, SF.260, Soko G-2 Galeb, Soko J-21
- Transport: Il-76, An-26

The Free Libyan Air Force (Arabic: القوات الجوية الليبية الحرة) was the air force of the National Transitional Council during the First Libyan Civil War. It was established by and was a collection of Libyan Air Force defectors with captured aircraft that aligned themselves with the anti-Gaddafi forces in the civil war.

== Operations ==
On 13 March 2011, Ali Atiyya, a colonel of the Libyan Air Force at the Mitiga military airport, near Tripoli defected and joined the revolution. This is the earliest reference to the anti-Gaddafi forces having Air Force personnel. Later on 16 March, as many as four MiG-21 fighter jets landed at Benghazi airport and joined the rebel forces; one of the MiG-21s crashed near Benina airport on the following day.

The Free Libyan Air Force showed itself for the first time on 15 March, launching an attack with a MiG-23 and a helicopter, sinking two pro-Gaddafi warships off the eastern coast near the front line of land battles at Adjabiya. Beforehand, the same aircraft also bombed an unspecified number of loyalist tanks near Brega and Ajdabiya. The same day, it was reported that Sirte's Gardabya Airport had its runways bombed by Free Libyan Air Force jets. On 19 March, a MiG-23 was shot down during the Second Battle of Benghazi. Media reports were initially confused, until a spokesman confirmed that the plane belonged to the rebels. A pro-Gaddafi spokesman said that the rebels had violated the UN no-fly zone. A rebel spokesman claimed the aircraft was shot down by pro-Gaddafi forces. Finally, BBC News reported on 20 March that the rebel aircraft was shot down by friendly fire, and the pilot, Colonel Mohammed Mbarak al-Okaili, was killed after ejecting too late. Another rebel jet was downed the same day, though no further information was given and it is possible that it is the plane lost on 22 March.

On 22 March, a pilot of the Free Libyan Air Force, Colonel Fakhri Alsalabi, flew his jet into Bab Al Azizia in an apparent suicide mission, causing extensive damage and leading to rumors of Khamis Gaddafi's death, who later was proven to have survived unharmed.

A total of 38 combat missions were flown by jet and helicopter pilots of the Free Libyan Air Force throughout March until the No Fly Zone was imposed, effectively grounding the small air force. Nine of these strikes were carried out by the rebels three Mi-35 helicopters gunships against Gaddafi's armoured columns advancing on Benghazi, one of which was destroyed.

On 9 April, a single rebel Mi-25 helicopter was seen flying over Ajdabiya and was claimed shot down by government forces. That same day, a rebel MiG-23 fighter was intercepted by NATO aircraft and escorted back to its base.

On 27 June 2011, three Free Libyan Air Force MiG-21s, one two seater and two single seaters were photographed over Benina Airport in Benghazi.

Later in the conflict, as supplies were being flown into areas of Libya besieged by Gaddafi loyalists, MiG-21 fighter jets under opposition control escorted the supply planes to protect them from loyalist attack.

After gaining permission from NATO, an AN-26 and BAE-146 of the Free Libyan Air Force flew from Libya for the 2011 Malta International Air Show on 24 and 25 September, joining the two Mirage F1s already stationed there. Libyan Air Force Brigadier General Mohammed Rajab conducted a ceremony where the Libyan Air Force green roundels on the Mirage F1s were replaced by the FLAF tricolour roundel, followed by the aircraft conducting the first foreign display by the FLAF. It was revealed at the airshow that the BAE-146 had been used for 32 covert flights during the conflict in spite of the no-fly zone, landing on desert roads to supply ammunition and transport injured rebels to hospital. The aircraft had been commanded by Capt Ali Samoussi. The Libyan Ambassador, Saadun Suayeh, was present, and described the replacement of the roundels as a moment of "pride, joy and honour", and expressed his hope that the aircraft would soon return to Libya.

On 23 October, three FLAF Mi-14's conducted a flypast at the declaration of national liberation ceremony in Benghazi overseen by Mustafa Abdul Jalil.

During the 2012 Sabha clashes a Free Libyan Air Force MiG-21bis and MiG-21UM were deployed to the area.

On April 11, 2012 a Free Libyan Air Force Mi-8T(cn8335) crashed on takeoff at Murzuq Airport after being overloaded. All 25 people on board survived though.

On April 12, 2012, a Free Libyan Air Force Mirage F1ED(cn502) crashed near Kasr El Hamrouniya Ben Gashir. The pilot was apparently killed in the crash. This accident is unconfirmed.

Following the near complete destruction of the Libyan air force by NATO bombing, the Free Libyan Air Force has since effectively become the new Libyan Air Force. It is unknown whether or not the Free Libyan air force exists still or if it is now totally integrated as part of the Libyan Air Force.

On 20 June 2012 the Air Force Chief of Staff, Saqr Geroushi, announced plans for the rebuilding of the Libyan Air Force. The plans included proposals for the purchase of two squadrons of French Rafale fighter aircraft, a number of French F1-Mirage jets, British Eurofighter Typhoons, and American C-130 Hercules cargo planes and Chinook helicopters.

The Free Libyan Air Force is looking to acquire up to 22 medium to heavy lift helicopters for cargo and troop ferrying. Known contenders are the Mil Mi-26 Halo, AgustaWestland AW101, and Boeing CH-47D/F Chinook.

== Aircraft ==
Aircraft	Country of origin	Type	Version	In service	Notes
Fighter Aircraft
Mirage F1	France	fighter aircraft	F1ED	2	2 defected to Malta on 21 February 2011, handed back on 22 February 2012. One F1ED (cn502) crashed on 12 April 2012 killing the pilot (this accident is unconfirmed.) Two airframes spotted during the second anniversary of the uprising in 2013.
MiG-21	Soviet Union	fighter aircraft	MiG‑21bis	2	Several captured in Benina and Tobruk airbases. Up to four MiG-21bis/UM defected at Benina airbase. One MiG-21bis crashed after take-off from Benina airport due to technical malfunction on 17 March 2011. One of these was deployed along with a MiG-21UM during the 2012 Sabha clashes.
MiG-23	Soviet Union	fighter aircraft	MiG‑23ML	2	Four captured by rebels at Tobruk air base. Four captured by rebels in hangar at Misrata. One captured by rebels at Al-Abrak. One MiG-23BN claimed to be lost over Tripoli on 13 March 2011. One MiG-23 was shot down over Benghazi on 19 March 2011. At least one is based at Benghazi along with a MiG-23UB.
Trainer Aircraft
Aero L-39 Albatros	Czechoslovakia	light attack/trainer	Aero L-39ZO	3	Two seized during the battle of Tripoli. At least 3 operational in 2013.
Soko J-21 Jastreb	Yugoslavia	ground-attack aircraft	J-1E	N/A	Two defected to Benghazi on 24 February. Current status unknown.
Soko G-2 Galeb	Yugoslavia	fighter trainer	G-2A-E	4	Several captured in Misrata airbase; At least 4 operational in 2013.
Aermacchi SF.260	Italy	basic trainer	SF.260WL/ML	6	Several captured in Misrata airbase. At least 6 operational in 2013.
MiG-21	Soviet Union	Lead-In Trainer	MiG-21UM	2	2 confirmed via photographs. One of these was deployed along with a MiG-21bis during the 2012 Sabha clashes.
MiG-23	Soviet Union	Lead-In Trainer	MiG-23UB	1	At least one based at Benghazi along with a MiG-23ML.
Transport Aircraft
British Aerospace 146	United Kingdom	regional airliner	BAe 146-300	1	Used for medical evacuation and delivering medical supplies, as well as supplying ammunition to remote rebel units.
Ilyushin Il-76	Soviet Union	strategic airlifter	Il-76TD	2	Seized by the United Arab Emirates in Dubai, transferred to the Free Libyan Air Force on 11 August, additional one seized during the battle of Tripoli. Probably not airworthy.
Antonov An-26	Soviet Union	medium transport		3	One captured by protesters in Kufra on 17 February, two seized during the battle of Tripoli. Probably not airworthy.
C-130 Hercules	USA	tactical transport	C-130H	1	
Lockheed L-100 Hercules	USA	transport		1	
Helicopters
Aérospatiale Gazelle	France / Yugoslavia	Attack helicopter	?	?	
Boeing CH-47 Chinook	United States	heavy transport helicopter	CH-47C	1	One seized during the battle of Tripoli. Probably not airworthy.
Mil Mi-2	Poland	transport helicopter	Mi-2	1+	Several captured in Misrata airbase; currently status is unknown.
Mil Mi-8	Soviet Union	transport helicopter	Mi-8T/MT	1	Captured in abandoned condition at Ra's Lanuf airfield on 4 March. Another Mi-8T(cn8335) crashed April 11, 2012 without any fatalities.
Mil Mi-14	Soviet Union	ASW helicopter	Mi-14	3	At least three captured in Benina airbase.
Mil Mi-17	Soviet Union/Russia	transport helicopter	Mi-17	2+	At least one captured in Benghazi. One was seen during the Battle of Sirte, another during the Battle of Misrata.
Mil Mi-24	Soviet Union	attack helicopter	Mi-25	1	At least two captured in Benina airbase; One shot down by loyalist forces.
Unmanned Aerial Vehicle
Aeryon Scout	Canada	Miniature UAV	Aeryon Scout	1	Aeryon Labs Inc provided one Aeryon Scout to the Libyan rebels, including training provided by Zariba Security Corporation.
Air defence SAM
Lavochkin SA-2	Soviet Union	Air defence SAM	SA-2	2	At least two have been reported captured by anti-government protesters and defected military units in Tobruk.
SA-5	Soviet Union	Air defence SAM	SA-5	1	One captured by rebels near Bani Walid.
