= Libyan Air Force =

Air warfare branch of Libya's armed forces

Libyan Air Forces
- القوات الجوية الليبية
- Libyan Air Force emblem
- Active: 1962; 64 years ago
- Country: Libya
- Allegiance: Government of National Unity (parts); House of Representatives (parts) Formerly: Government of National Accord (parts)
- Branch: Libyan Armed Forces
- Type: Air Force
- Role: Aerial warfare
- Size: Unknown (2025)
- Headquarters: Tripoli (GNU-backed); Tobruk (HoR-backed)
- Equipment: 12 combat aircraft (GNU-backed); 33 combat aircraft (HoR-backed)
- Engagements: Egyptian–Libyan War; Uganda–Tanzania War; Chadian–Libyan War; First Libyan Civil War; Post-civil war violence in Libya; Second Libyan Civil War

Commanders
- Commander-in-Chief: Mohamed al-Menfi
- Chief of Staff: Saqr Geroushi (pro-HoR)

Insignia
- Roundel

Aircraft flown
- Attack: Su-22, Su-24, TAI Hürkuş
- Fighter: MiG-21, MiG-23, Mirage F1
- Helicopter: Mil Mi-2, Mil Mi-8, Mil Mi-14, AW139, CH-47
- Attack helicopter: Mil Mi-24/35
- Trainer: Aero L-39 Albatros, Soko G-2 Galeb, SF.260
- Transport: C-130 Hercules, L-100 Hercules, An-12, An-26, An-72, Il-76

The Libyan Air Forces (Arabic: القوات الجوية الليبية) is the service branch of the Libyan Armed Forces responsible for aerial warfare. In 2010, before the First Libyan Civil War, the Libyan Air Force personnel strength was estimated at 18,000, with an inventory of 374 combat-capable aircraft operating from 13 military airbases in Libya. Since the 2011 civil war and the second Libyan civil war, multiple factions fighting in Libya are in possession of operational fighter jets and military aircraft. As of 2026, the Libyan Air Forces is nominally under the control of the internationally-recognised Government of National Unity in Tripoli, though the rival Libyan Arab Armed Forces of Field Marshal. Khalifa Haftar also has a significant air force. In 2021, the air force is under command of the new President of Libya, Mohamed al-Menfi that replaced Fayez al-Sarraj.

The air force was established as the Royal Libyan Air Force (Al Quwwat al Jawwiya al Malakiya al Libiyya) in September 1962 by a decision of the minister of defense Abd al-Nabi Yunis. Lt. Col. al-Hadi Salem al-Husomi was assigned to lead the new force. It was originally equipped with a small number of transports and trainers: Douglas C-47s and Lockheed T-33s. However, F-5 Freedom Fighters were delivered from 1969. In 1970 it changed its name to the Libyan Arab Republic Air Force. After US forces left Libya in 1970, Wheelus Air Base, a former US facility about 11 kilometres (6.8 mi) from Tripoli, became a LARAF installation and was renamed Okba Ben Nafi Air Base. The base housed the LARAF's headquarters and a large share of its major training facilities. Starting in 1970, a significant expansion of the air force took place, with a large number of French and later Soviet combat aircraft being purchased.

== History ==
=== Early years (1962–1969) ===
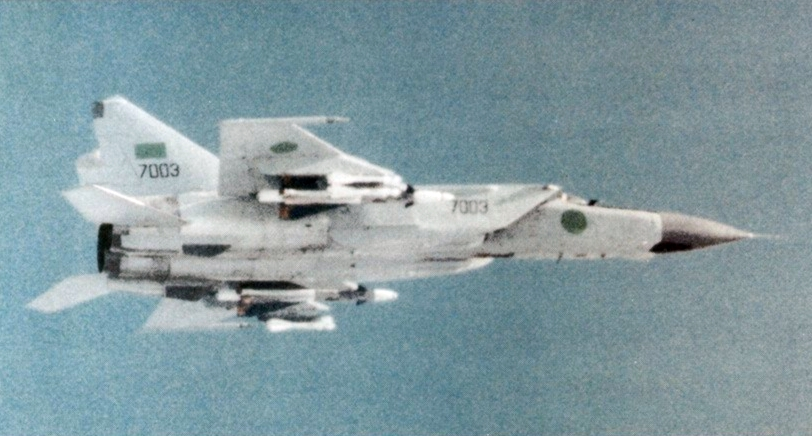
A LAAF Mikoyan-Gurevich MiG-25.

In May 1967, the Kingdom of Libya reached an agreement with the United States to supply 10 Northrop F-5s to the Royal Libyan Air Force. These were the first fighters for the young Air Force, which only operated six Douglas C-47 transports and three Lockheed T-33A trainers at the time. Fifty-six personnel underwent training at bases in the US, pilots at Williams Air Force Base; a US Survey Team on Expansion came to Libya in August 1968 to supervise the introduction of the fighters. Serviceability of the F-5s declined after the 1969 coup and it appears that most may have eventually been sold to Turkey.

The Libyan Air Defence Force was part of the Air Force and had the second largest air defence network in the region (second to Egypt). However, the equipment – which was mainly Soviet weaponry from the 1960s and 1970s – was outdated and it proved inefficient during the 1986 bombing of Libya by the US Air Force. Only one of the 45 attacking US aircraft was shot down. Due to an embargo during the 1980s, the system could not be upgraded following the US attack.

=== Early Gaddafi era (1969–1989) ===
During the months following the 1969 coup d'état, Libya distanced itself from the United Kingdom and the United States. Nevertheless, in 1971, eight C-130Hs were delivered by the United States. Instead, close ties were developed with France. Accordingly, an order for 110 Dassault Mirage 5s, twelve Fouga Magisters, ten Aérospatiale Alouette IIIs and nine Aérospatiale SA 321 Super Frelons was signed in December 1969. Negotiations for the purchase of Soviet military aircraft only started in 1973, in the light of the experiences of the Yom Kippur War. These resulted in the delivery of 54 MiG-23MS interceptors and MiG-23UB trainers, 35 MiG-23BN attack aircraft, and 64 MiG-21bis fighters and MiG-21UM trainers. Fourteen Tupolev Tu-22 bombers were also bought in this period. Relations with France were maintained, and 16 Dassault Mirage F1AD, 6 F1BD and 16 F1ED were ordered in 1975. Lastly, 240 SIAI-Marchetti SF.260 trainers were bought from Italy, as well as 50 Soko G-2 Galebs. In the mid-1970s, 20 CH-47 Chinook heavy transport helicopters were also acquired from Italy, 14 of which were transferred to the army during the 1990s.

With all of these acquisitions, within a few years, the number of aircraft on strength in the LAAF increased drastically. However, there was no way of training enough pilots and ground crews to operate all of these. Hence, agreements were passed with friendly countries to operate some of the LAAF's aircraft. Two MiG-23 squadrons were manned by Syrian aircrews. Similarly, around 100 North Korean airmen operated MiG-21s between 1979 and 1981. Lastly, some of the newly acquired aircraft were put into storage. Of the combat aircraft, the United States Department of State estimated in 1983 that 50 percent remained in storage, including most of the MiG fighters and Tu-22 bombers.

Dassault Mirage 5s bought shortly after Gaddafi took power were secretly used by Egypt during the Yom Kippur War. These were later returned to Libya. These aircraft were retired in 2008, becoming used for Pakistan Air Force spares.

The Libyan Arab Republic Air Force operated a large number of Mikoyan-Gurevich MiG-25s, some sources say more than 60 were delivered. Types were of the MiG-25PD, MiG-25RBK, MiG-25PU and MiG-25RU variants. They were operated by No. 1025 Squadron at Jufra-Hun, No. 1055 Squadron at Ghardabiya and an unidentified squadron at Sabha Air Base. As of February 2007 AirForces Monthly reported all aircraft of the type had been retired.

In the 1970s and '80s Libyan MiGs and Tupolevs were common visitors to international airspace, close to Italy and NATO bases. On 19 July 1980, a crashed Libyan Arab Air Force MiG-23 was discovered on the Sila Mountains near Castelsilano, southern Italy. The event is speculated to be connected to the loss of Itavia Flight 870 a few weeks earlier.

The LAAF lost a total of four aircraft to United States Navy F-14 Tomcats in two incidents over the Gulf of Sidra, in 1981 and 1989. In addition, many planes were destroyed or damaged on the ground in 1986 when American planes attacked targets at Benina International Airport in Benghazi and Mitiga International Airport in Tripoli.

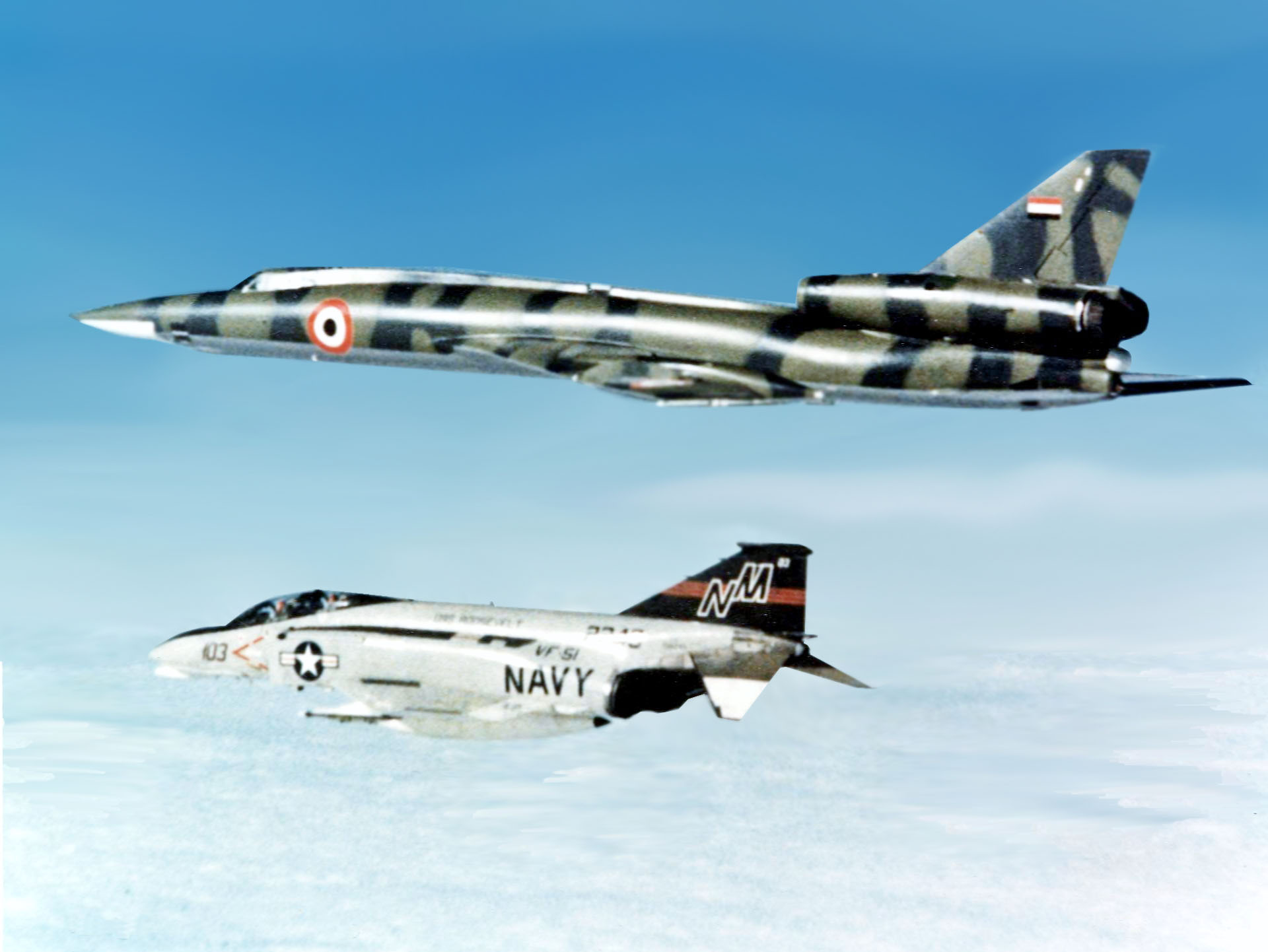
A US Navy F-4N Phantom II intercepts a Tupolev Tu-22 being delivered to the Libyan Arab Republic, April 1977.

The air force was extensively used in the fighting in Chad in the 1980s, in support of Libyan ground units. It was reported that many Libyan Arab Air Force bombing raids were carried out at excessively high altitudes when met with anti-aircraft fire, so the attacks were not very effective. On 17 February 1986, in retaliation for the Ouadi Doum air raid by the French air force, a single LAAF Tu-22B attacked the airport at N'Djamena. That aircraft ran into technical problems on its return journey – American early warning reconnaissance planes based in Sudan monitored distress calls sent by the pilot of the Tu-22 which probably crashed before reaching its base at Aouzou (maybe hit by twin-tubes that fired at it from N'Djamena airport). On 7 September 1987, another Tu-22 was shot down over N'Djamena by a French MIM-23 HAWK battery.

In November 1986 Libyan jets carried out countless attacks and bombings against Zaghawa and Toubou civilian populations, ethnic groups mostly loyal to the Chadian government. During these aerial terror campaigns a large number of villages in the B.E.T region were completely devastated, a large number of people were killed and thousands fled to seek refuge in caves or crossed into refugee camps in Darfur. The Government of Chad denounced these attacks on civilians as genocide.

The Chadians seized the Ouadi Doum base in 1987 and destroyed or captured two SF.260s, three Mil Mi-25s, two Tu-22B bombers, eleven L-39 jets, two complete 9K33 Osa (SA-8) SAM batteries, and a plethora of additional equipment, weapons, supplies and ammunition – a good deal of which was flown out to France and the United States within the next five days. Four USAF C-5 Galaxy transport aircraft were sent to N'Djamena to collect the captured Jamahiriya equipment. On 5 September 1987 Chadian technicals crossed into Libya and attacked the Maaten al-Sarra Air Base which is 96.5 kilometres (60.0 mi) within Libyan territory. The battle of Maaten al-Sarra was a major victory for Chad and several LAAF aircraft were destroyed on the ground with only minor Chadian casualties.

On 8 October 1987, an LAAF Sukhoi Su-22 was shot down by a man-portable air defence system in northern Chad. The pilot, Captain Dia ad-Din, ejected and was captured. The LAAF immediately organized a recovery operation; subsequently a MiG-23BN was also shot down. Its pilot was recovered. In November 1988, a Libyan Arab Air Force SIAI-Marchetti SF.260 was shot down over northern Chad, and its crew was captured.

=== Post–Cold War to Libyan civil war ===
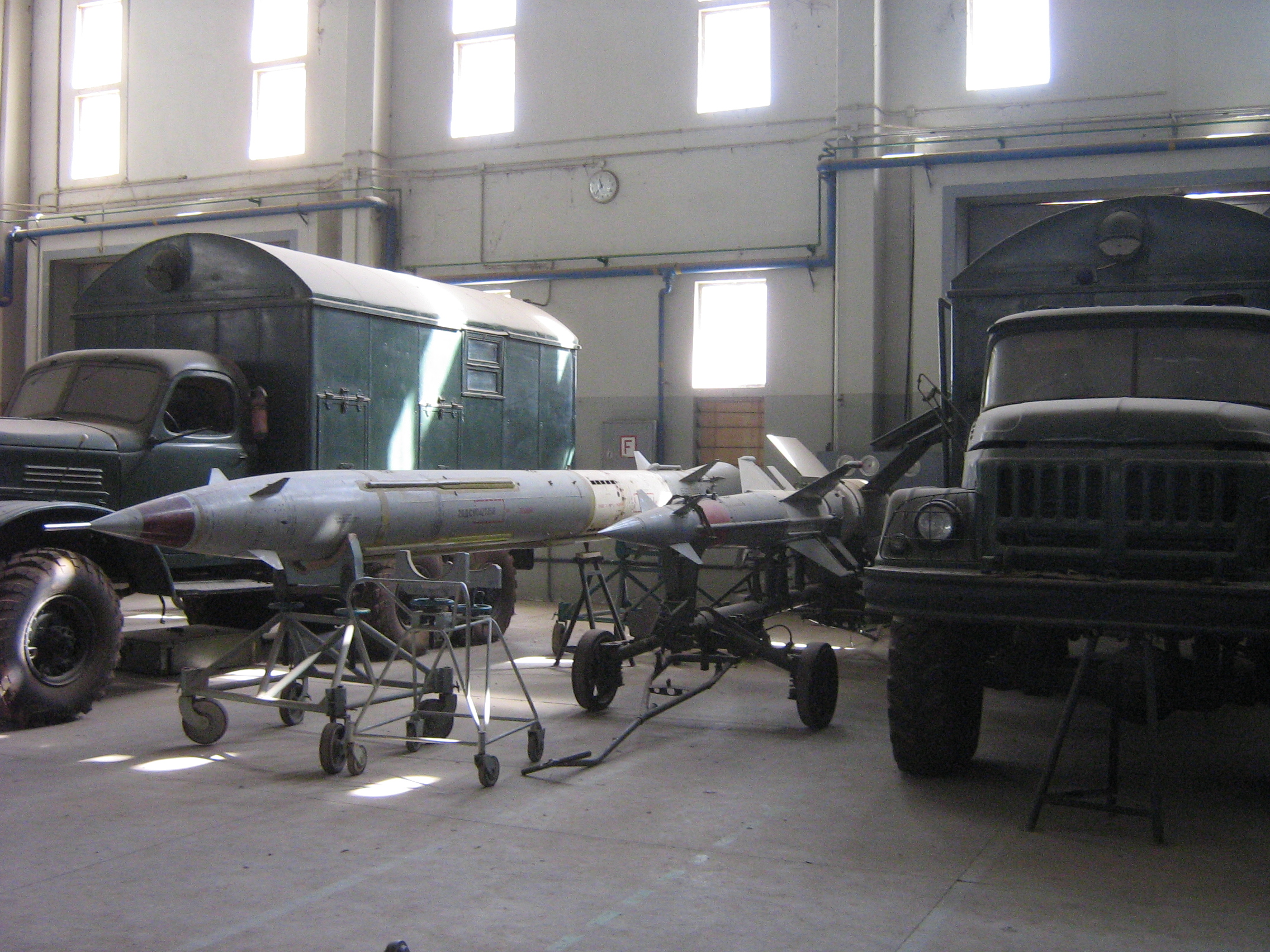
Libyan Air Defence missiles

With the dissolution of the Soviet Union and the elimination of military aid by the new Russian Federation, Soviet/Russian support was drastically curtailed. The last major delivery of Soviet aircraft to the Libyan Arab Jamahiriya was six Sukhoi Su-24s in March/April 1989.

In the mid-1990s, Libya paid for spares for Syrian Arab Air Force Su-24MK fighter-bombers, in exchange for Syrian help to operate Libya's own Su-24s. In an expression of gratitude for this cooperation, the LAAF gifted its sole Su-24MR (a specialized reconnaissance and electronic warfare variant) to Syria.

In January 2008 Libya signed a contract for one ATR 42MP maritime patrol aircraft from Italy's Alenia. Other reports mentioned four ATR 42s.

=== Libyan civil war/NATO intervention ===
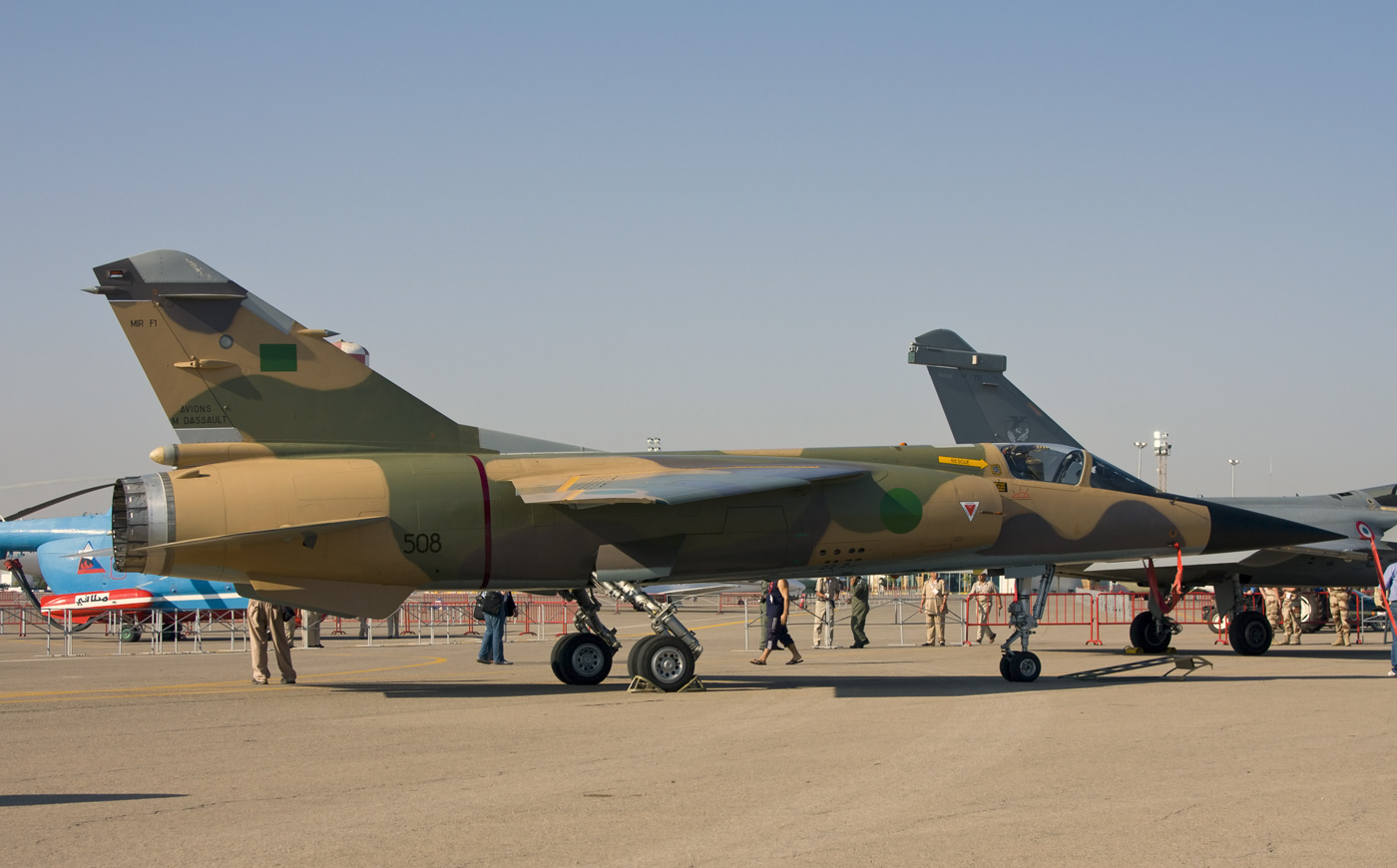
Libyan People's Air Force Mirage F1ED

Before the war began, Libyan People's Air Force had between 18,000 and 22,000 personnel and 374 aircraft and helicopters—however, most of these aircraft were not flyable, and the air force in general was in a very poor state when the war began. During the Libyan Civil War, Libyan People's Air Force warplanes and attack helicopters launched repeated airstrikes on protesters, reportedly targeting a funeral procession and a group of protesters trying to reach an army base. The human rights researcher Ahmed Elgazir had reported, that the Libyan News Centre (LNC) received a satellite phone call from an unnamed woman who was "witnessing the massacre in progress". This information could not be verified, since phone lines in the country had been blocked. During the opening month of the Libyan civil war between 19 February and 19 March, rebel forces managed to capture four out of 13 Libyan air force airfields, and were attacking multiple others—to prevent their destruction, according to the opposition sources, most of Libyan People's Air Force fighter jets and helicopters that were still serviceable were relocated to Ghardabiya Air Force base near Sirte and Mitiga Air Force Base near Tripoli.

On 21 February 2011, two senior LPAF pilots, Colonel Ali al-Rabiti and Colonel Abdullah Salheen, defected to the opposition – they flew their Mirage F-1ED fighter jets, serial numbers "502" and "508" to Malta and requested political asylum after defying orders to bomb protesters. On 17 February, an AN-26 transport plane was reportedly captured by prostesters in Kufra, while on 20 February, a pro-Gadaffi helicopter (either Mi-8 or Mi-24) was reportedly shot down at Bayda.

On 23 February 2011, pilot Abdessalam Attiyah al-Abdali and co-pilot Ali Omar al-Kadhafi—crew of a Sukhoi-22—ejected with parachutes near Ajdabiya, 161 kilometres (100 mi) west of Benghazi, after refusing orders to bomb the city of Benghazi, thus crashing their Su-22 bomber. Anti-Gaddafi forces and Syrian opposition groups claim that Syrian pilots were flying attacks for the Libyan Arab Jamahiriya. According to the opposition sources, many Libyan People's Air Force pilots have multiple times refused to obey orders to bomb protesters, instead dropping their bombs purposely off target in deserted areas. Also on the same day, on 23 February 2011, rebels captured the Benina air force base south of Benghazi—during the battle for the airport, one pro-Gadaffi Mi-24 combat attack helicopter (serial number "853") was destroyed on the ground by rebel forces, while two more helicopters (Mi-25D combat attack helicopter serial number "854", and one Mi-14 transport helicopter serial number "1406") were captured by the rebel forces. Rebels claimed to have shot down Jamahiriya fighter jets and attack helicopters over Brega and Ra's Lanuf. Another pro-Gadaffi helicopter (either Mi-8 or Mi-24) was shot down at Misrata by rebel forces with MANPAD-s, the crew of five survived and was captured by rebel forces.

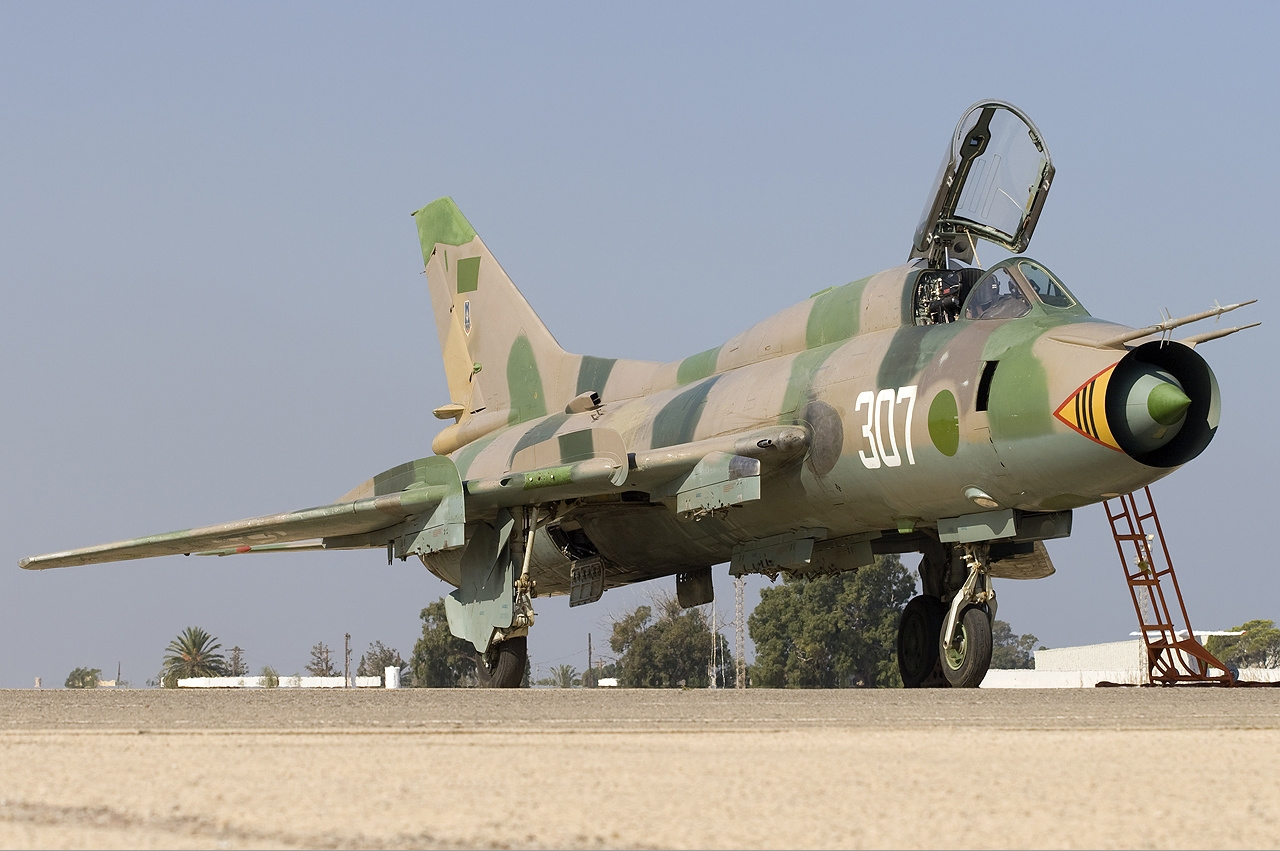
A LARAF Sukhoi Su-22M3 Fitter-H

At Brega a pro-Gadaffi Mirage F-1ED fighter jet was shot down by the rebel forces on 2 March 2011, thus leaving just one Mirage F-1BD trainer aircraft in possession of Gadaffi's loyalist forces, while that same day one pro-Gadaffi SU-22M-3K was damaged by rebel anti-aircraft fire at Brega (the rebel sources claimed that they shot it down). Several more pro-Gadaffi helicopters and fighter jets were reportedly shot down by rebel forces during the fight for Brega between 2 March and 3 March, however this claims remain uncomfirmed. Several days later, on 4 March, one abandoned pro-Gadaffi Mi-8MT air ambulance helicopter serial number "2119" was captured by rebel forces at Ra's Lanuf airfield. Also, on 5 March 2011, rebels shot down near Ra's Lanuf a pro-Gadaffi Su-24MK bomber, serial number "38" of the 1124th Libyan air force squadron with a ZU-23-2 anti-aircraft gun (both pilots were killed), and then the next day, rebels also shot down a pro-Gadaffi helicopter (either a Mi-8 or Mi-24) near Ra's Lanuf with a ZPU-4 anti-aircraft gun. Three more pro-Gadaffi fighter jets (two of them Su-22 fighter bombers—their pilots were captured, reportedly being Syrian and Sudanese mercenaries) and two more pro-Gadaffi helicopters (either Mi-8 or Mi-24) were reportedly shot down by rebel forces during the fight for Ra's Lanuf between 5 March and 7 March, however these claims remain uncomfirmed. Exactly how many and what types of aircraft have been shot down were not confirmed by Jamahiriya government or independent sources. Using air power, the Libyan military checked the opposition advance westwards, towards Bin Jawad in early March. By 11 March, the pro-Gadaffi air force was running out of quality jet fuel, and attempts were made to bribe Maltese Air Force officials to purchase more fuel. On 13 March, Ali Atiyya, a colonel of the Libyan People's Air Force at the Mitiga military airport, near Tripoli, announced that he had defected and joined the revolution, and this is the earliest case of Libyan air force personnel defecting to the opposition. Very quickly defections have started to have effect on pro-Gadaffi air force—according to the opposition sources, hundreds of pilots, technicians and ground personnel have defected to the opposition during the first half of March. On the same day, on 13 March 2011, according to the news published on 20 March by the opposition media wing Al Manara Media, pilot Muhammad Mokhtar Osman crashed his fighter jet, an MiG-23BN, on Bab al-Azizia compound in Tripoli in an apparent kamikaze-style suicide attack on pro-Gadaffi military high command, in which Khamis Gadaffi was heavily wounded and died from his wounds a week later on 20 March; however, this news wasn't confirmed by any independent sources and was right away denied by pro-Gadaffi media wing, and was finally confirmed to be misinformation when on 9 June a captured pro-Gadaffi loyalist soldier in Misrata told the rebel forces that he personally saw that Khamis Gadaffi was alive and well, leading his soldiers in Zliten.

On 15 March 2011, Free Libyan air force aircraft conducted its first air attacks against Gadaffi loyalists, flying six combat sorties. According to the opposition sources, on that day rebel MiG-23BN fighter jet and Mi-24 combat attack helicopter first sank two Gadaffi loyalist warships and damaged a third Gadaffi loyalist warship near the coast of Ajadabiyah, and then bombed Gaddafi loyalist tank columns outside of Brega and Ajadabiyah. Also, on that same day, rebel MiG-23BN fighter jets bombed the Ghardabiya air force base, damaging its runway. On 16 March 2011, pilots of one MiG-21bis and one MiG-21UM fighter jets which took off from the Ghardabiya airport defected with their planes to the opposition and landed in rebel-held air force base in Brega. Free Libyan air force aircraft conducted more air attacks on 16 March, flying three combat sorties with Mi-24 and Mi-8 helicopters, bombing pro-Gadaffi tank columns near Ajadabiyah—during those combat sorties one rebel Mi-24 combat attack helicopter was shot down by pro-Gadaffi forces near Ajadabiyah, killing three crew members while only one crew member, Ismael Kuttep, survived (among the killed was Hussien Werfalli, commander of rebel helicopter squadron at Benina air force base, who defected to the opposition from Ghardabiya air force base just days earlier).

Rebels claimed to have shot down what appeared to be a MiG-21 outside of Bohadi. On 17 March, a pro-Gadaffi Su-22UM3K fighter bomber was shot down over Benina AB, the pilot, reportedly an Algerian mercenary, ejected safely and was captured by rebel forces. On that same day, on 17 March 2011, a "Free Libya Air Force" MiG-21UM crashed after take off from Benina airport due to technical problems, the pilot ejected safely. The rebel MiG-21UM that crashed on 17 March was flown from Ghardabiya Air Base near Sirte to Benina by a defecting pilot the day before. On that same day on 17 March 2011, Gadaffi loyalist fighter jets bombed the rebel-held Benina air force base, damaging three passenger aircraft—two YAK-40 and one Boeing 737-26D operated by Air Libya—that were parked there on the runway.

On 19 March 2011, a rebel MiG-23BN was shot down over Benghazi by rebel air defence forces in a case of mistaken identity. The pilot, colonel Mohammed Mbarak al-Okali ejected but at a very low altitude, and was killed as a result. BBC News reported on 20 March that the rebel aircraft was shot down by its own air defenses during an attempt to bomb advancing pro-Gadaffi tank columns near Benghazi.

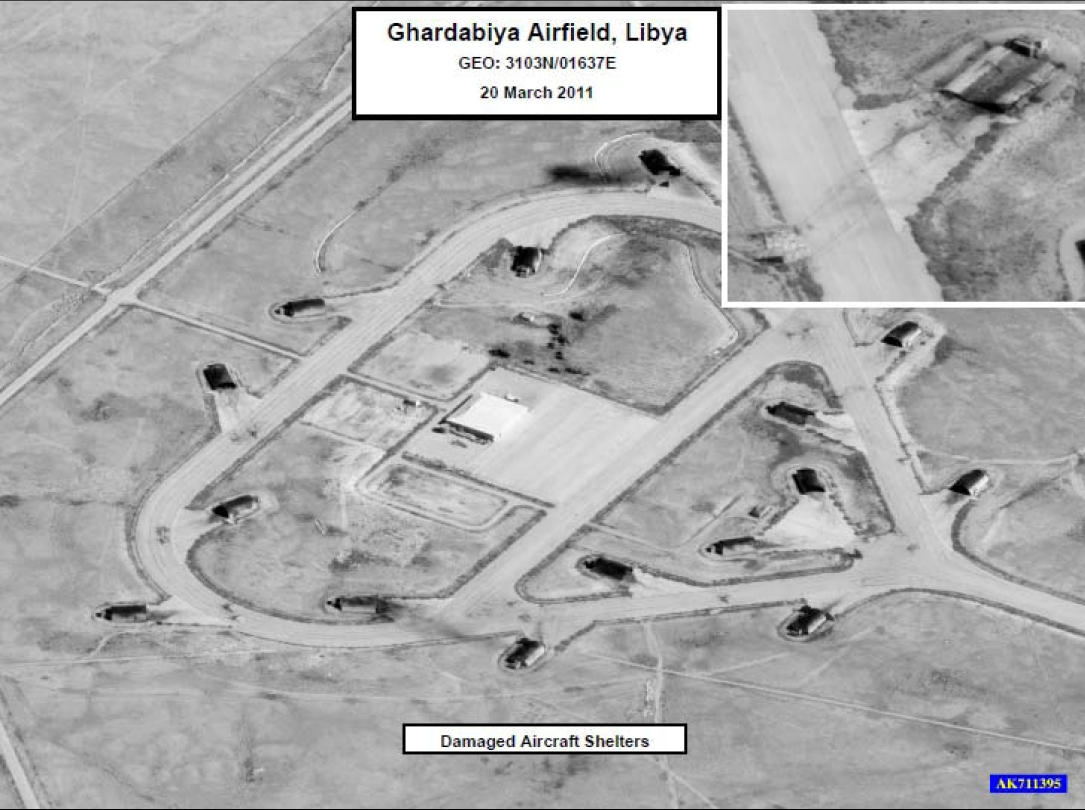
Damage to the Libyan People's Air Force airfield Ghardabiya after being attacked by coalition aircraft, 20 March 2011

According to the opposition sources, rebel MiG-21 and MiG-23 fighter jets, Mi-24 combat attack helicopters, 14 rebel fighter pilots, 50 technicians and hundreds of ground personnel, all stationed at the Benina air force base, were crucial in their defence of Benghazi from pro-Gadaffi offensive, launching multiple airstrikes during the first half of March on advancing Gadaffi forces in eastern Libya, with the hardest day of combat for the Free Libya air force being 19 March, when pro-Gadaffi forces tried to capture Benghazi. But rebel air force suffered heavy losses in process—according to opposition sources, between 1 March and 19 March, rebel air force launched a total of 38 combat sorties (nine of which were conducted by Mi-24 combat attack helicopters) against advancing pro-Gadaffi forces in eastern Libya, but lost in the process two fighter jets and one helicopter, suffering eight pilots and gunmen killed.

On 17 March 2011., the UN Security council adopted the United Nations Security Council resolution 1973 which legitimised the military operation against the pro-Gadaffi regime – with 10 votes in favour, 0 against and 5 abstentions, a no-fly zone was established over the whole of Libya with the United Nations Security Council resolution 1973. Despite that, both pro-Gadaffi and pro-rebel air forces continued their sorties for the next two days, launching multiple airstrikes up until the night of 19 March, when a no-fly zone was finally implemented by NATO forces, grounding both rebel and pro-Gadaffi fighter jets from then on. In the late afternoon of 19 March, first coalition airstrikes were launched against the Gadaffi regime, with French fighter jets bombing pro-Gadaffi tank columns at the entrance to Benghazi, stopping their offensive against rebel forces in Benghazi. US and British warships then launched more than 120 Tomahawk cruise missiles against Jamahiriya air defences and four US B-2 stealth bombers attacked and destroyed several Jamahiriya airfields during the night of 19 March, with more airstrikes and cruise missile strikes being launched against the pro-Gadaffi regime during the next several days, destroying the combat capabilities of pro-Gadaffi Libyan air force and anti-air defences.

On 22 March, a US air force F15E fighter jet crashed near Benghazi due to mechanical problems; both pilots ejected safely and were then rescued by US search and rescue teams, and during the rescue of the US pilots, US search and rescue teams shot and wounded six libyan civilians on the ground. On 23 March 2011, British Air Vice-Marshal Greg Bagwell was quoted by the BBC saying that the Libyan People's Air Force "no longer exists as a fighting force" and that Libyan air defenses had been damaged to the extent that NATO forces could now operate over Libyan airspace "with impunity." On 24 March, several media sources reported that a French Dassault Rafale destroyed a G-2 Galeb near Misrata. Initial reports of the French action said the LPAF plane, a G-2/Galeb with a single engine, was in the air when it was hit. French military spokesman Col. Thierry Burkhard later said the plane had just landed when the attack took place.

On 26 March 2011, the French Air Force reported that five Soko G-2 Galeb aircraft were destroyed on the ground at Misrata airport together with two Mi-35 helicopters, but satellite images later showed that the five fixed wing aircraft destroyed were actually MiG-23s.

A Belgian Air Force F-16 hit a Libyan People's Air Force Su-22UM3K plane on the ground during an operation on 27 March. On 9 April, a Free Libyan air force Mi-25D combat attack helicopter (serial number "854"—the same one that was captured by the rebel forces at Benina air force base on 23 February 2011) bombed positions of Gaddafi's soldiers at Ajadabiya, but it was then shot down by Gaddafi loyalist forces; its pilot captain Hussein al-Warfali was killed. Also on the same day on 9 April, a Free Libyan air force MiG-23BN fighter jet was intercepted by NATO fighter jets over Benghazi, and escorted back to its base in accordance with the UN-authorized and established no-fly zone over Libya.

On 7 May, after weeks of complete inactivity, the Libyan People's Air Force conducted a successful air raid over the rebel-held fuel depots at Misrata, bombing them and setting them on fire. The rebels reported that the raid was conducted with crop dusting aircraft, but probably SF.260 light attack aircraft were used taking off from Misrata airport. NATO failed to intercept the bombing mission. During the entire war and NATO-led intervention in Libya, Libyan rebel forces extensively used their three MiG-21 fighter jets as fighter escort of supply flights to western Libya, guarding transport aircraft that were delivering supplies to besieged rebel garrisons and cities in western Libya, flying despite the NATO-imposed no-fly zone over Libya. These three Free Libya air force jets—two MiG-21bis single-seat and one MiG-21UM two-seat fighter jets—were photographed flying over the Benina air force base south of Benghazi on 27 June 2011.

Following the defeat of forces loyal to Muammar Gaddafi and the rebel victory in October 2011, the no-fly zone was lifted and two grounded Jamahiriya air force Mirage F-1ED that had been based in Malta after their pilots refused orders to bomb the opposition during the civil war, were then given permission to return to Libya. The jets were finally returned to Libya on 21 February 2012, exactly a year to the day after they defected.

Combat Aircraft's May 2011 issue included an article covering the air elements of the 2011 Libyan civil war.

=== Second Civil War ===
On 20 June 2012 the Air Force Chief of Staff, Saqr Geroushi, announced plans for the rebuilding of the Libyan air force. The plans included proposals for the purchase of two squadrons of French Rafale fighter aircraft, a number of British Eurofighter Typhoons; and additional new French F1-Mirage jets, American C-130H Hercules cargo planes and CH-47 Chinook helicopters—as the post–2011 air force inherited some intact Mirages, C-130Hs and CH-47s following the civil war.

As the situation deteriorated with the country sliding into the Second Libyan Civil War, any ambitious plan was scrapped in face of the reality with the remaining Gaddafi regime era air-frames divided between the opposing factions. In the following months, both the internationally recognized government and the opposing New General National Congress flew a limited number of air operations against each other. The air force of the internationally recognized government could receive some limited supplies of MiG-21s and Mi-8 from the Egyptian Air Force too. Libyan aircraft carried out airstrikes against Islamists during the conflict, but have sustained considerable casualties. The biggest setback for the pro-GNA forces happened on 9 August 2014, when pro-LNA forces captured al-Watiya air force base, where 10 to 12 decommissioned Su-22 bombers, several Mi-25 combat attack helicopters and possibly up to 21 decommissioned Mirage F-1ED fighter jets, as well as all spare parts and weapons for Mirage F-1ED and Su-22 aircraft, were stored there—this defeat crippled the pro-GNA air forces, because now they lost their main source of spare parts for maintaining their Mirage F-1ED fighter jets. The al-Watiya air force base was one of the few that escaped total destruction during the NATO-led intervention in 2011 because in its 43 hardened aircraft shelters were stored almost exclusively decommissioned aircraft, so they were not deemed a threat to coalition forces. Just several munition depots located near the airbase and only three hardened aircraft shelters, one where the last operational pro-Gaddafi Mirage F-1BD trainer fighter jet was stationed, and two where the last two operational pro-Gaddafi Su-22M3 bombers were stationed were destroyed.

One of the pro-GNA fighter jets, a MiG-23UB aircraft, was shot down on 22 March 2015 at Al-Zintan by pro-LNA fighters with an Igla MANPADs while bombing the pro-LNA positions at Al-Zintan airport. A second pro-GNA fighter jet, this time MiG-23ML aircraft, crashed on 22 December 2016 at Tarhouna due to technical problems—both of its pilots, Mohammed Gadosha and Ezzidin Madani, were killed.

At the same time, Ukrainians started to work on the restoration of two MiG-25 and one MiG-25UB aircraft, which were mainly used for reconnaissance of enemy positions from the air. These aircraft were one of several dozen Libyan MiG-25 fighter jets stored for decades after being decommissioned at Al-Juffrah air force base (and so were spared from destruction in NATO-led intervention in 2011 because they weren't considered a threat to NATO-led forces), and these MiG-25 aircraft were relocated by pro-GNA forces from the Al-Juffrah air force base to the Misrata air force base at the beginning of 2015 to be overhauled, repaired and returned to active combat service. One of those newly restored aircraft, a two-seat MiG-25PU trainer version, crashed during its first post-restoration flight on 6 May 2015—(LNA claims that it shot it down, but that remains unconfirmed), during a bombing run on positions of pro-LNA forces at the civilian airport at Al-Zintan. Its pilot, colonel Hassan Mahmoud Misrati, successfully ejected and was captured by the pro-LNA forces. Despite poor performances in the war, pro-GNA forces with the help of Ukrainian specialists continued to overhaul and repair more MiG-25 fighter jets through 2017 and 2018 to bring them back to active combat service.

Besides MiG-25 aircraft, the Ukrainians also refurbished both Mirage F-1ED fighter jets of the pro-GNA air forces (serial numbers 502 and 508—the same two that defected to Malta on 21 February 2011), and with their help the pro-GNA forces brought them back into operational status by early 2015, using them extensively to bomb both ISIL militants and pro-LNA forces throughout 2016—but on 3 June 2016, one of the two pro-GNA Mirage F1ED fighter jets crashed west of the city of Sirte due to technical problems, its pilot ejected safely (according to other sources, ISIL militants shot it down, its pilot, a Portuguese mercenary, was killed). The last remaining pro-GNA Mirage F1ED fighter jet was not airworthy as of 2017 and was put in storage by the pro-GNA forces, as it lacked a functional engine due to lack of spare parts.

Despite the pro-GNA L-39ZO Albatros having mediocre combat characteristics, they avoided combat losses—one pro-GNA L-39ZO crashed due to technical problems near the University of Sirte on 10 August 2016 (ISIL claims that they shot it down); both of its pilots, commander of Misrata air force base brigadier general Mukhtar Fakroun and co-pilot colonel Omar Dogha, died in the crash. With the help of Ukrainian specialists, pro-GNA air forces also managed to bring back to service several major transport aircraft that were in storage for over a decade—one CH-130H Hercules (serial number "118"), one An-32P, and one Il-78 (serial number 5A-DLL—this is a former Libyan People's Air force aerial refueling aircraft, but now used solely as a transport aircraft by pro-GNA forces), all of which were flown by Sudanese mercenaries.

During all of 2016, the pro-GNA Libyan Air Force carried out numerous air strikes on positions of the group Islamic State of Iraq and the Levant (ISIL), which had taken control of parts of northern Libya around the city of Sirte—using their L-39ZO, Mirage F-1ED and MiG-23ML fighter jets, pro-GNA forces conducted dozens of airstrikes on ISIL positions both outside and inside of the city of Sirte during the entire summer of 2016, but with limited results. During the 2015. and 2016., pro-GNA air force has launched over 600 airstrikes on both pro-LNA forces and ISIL militants in and around the city of Sirte, with vast majority of these strikes being conducted by pro-GNA aircraft stationed at the Misrata air force base (as seen by news camera on 4 September 2016. At the Misrata air force base – two MiG-23MLD, five G-2 Galeb, 10 L-39ZO Albatros, and one J-21 Jastreb fighter jets, as well as two Mi-24P combat attack helicopter and one Mi-8T transport helicopter). Also, by the summer of 2016, pro-GNA air forces run out of both spare parts, fuel, and even money, and without being paid, most of the mercenaries and engineers that were by then serving in pro-GNA air force just left, crippling its fighting capabilities. Pilots were another problem for the pro-GNA air force – both mercenary pilots and local Libyan pilots refused on many occasions to "bomb the Libyan people", refusing to obey orders of the pro-GNA air force to bomb pro-LNA positions and leaving because of that, which severely limited their fighting capabilities. Probably because of that, and because of lack of progress against ISIL militants in the battle for Sirte in 2016., pro-GNA forces formally requested the US air force to start conducting air strikes against ISIL militants in and around the city of Sirte starting from 1 August 2016. under the name "Operation Odyssey Lightning", which helped the pro-GNA forces to advance in the city – by the time Sirte was finally captured by pro-GNA forces on 6 December 2016. and "Operation Odyssey Lightning" declared concluded by AFRICOM on 20 December 2016., US air force conducted 495 precision airstrikes on ISIL positions in and around the city of Sirte, killing around 800 to 900 ISIL militants.

Since 2016, both the Tobruk-based House of Representatives backed by Khalifa Haftar's Libyan National Army as well as the internationally recognised Government of National Accord in Tripoli have had many military aircraft in their possession. The Air Force has nominally been under the GNA's control. After Haftar gained power in eastern Libya, its part of the pro-LNA Libyan air force, made of MiG-21, MiG-23BN and MiG-23ML fighter jets, was actively restored and modernized by Egypt and UAE military, and pro-LNA air force conducted numerous air strikes on Islamist positions throughout eastern Libya, especially in Derna and Benghazi, during all of 2016 and 2017, but suffered heavy losses in aircraft and personnel in progress – one pro-LNA MiG-23ML fighter jets, serial number "6472", crashed due to technical problems on 4 January 2016 near Benghazi, at Benina air force base after returning from a bombing raid against Islamists; its pilot ejected safely (the Islamists claim that they shot it down). At the same time, using the captured equipment in al-Watiya air force base, pro-LNA forces started to bring back to active service several Su-22 bombers and Mirage F-1ED fighter jets in 2014 and 2015.

A second pro-LNA MiG-23ML fighter jet, serial number "6132", was shot down on 8 February 2016 by the Islamists during its bombing raid on Islamist positions in the town of Derna (LNA claims it crashed due to technical problems), its pilot colonel Younes al-Dinali ejected safely. A third pro-LNA fighter jet, this time an MiG-23UB serial number "7834", was shot down by the Islamists during its bombing raid on Islamist positions in Garyunes area, Benghazi (LNA claims that it crashed due to technical problems), on 12 February 2016, its pilot ejected safely. In response to such heavy losses, during March and April 2016, two MiG23BN fighter jets with in-flight refueling probes, serial numbers "8985" and "4136", which were in storage ever since the early 1990s at Al Abraq air force base, were quickly brought back to service by pro-LNA air force engineers and technicians. But despite that, heavy losses of pro-LNA air force continued.

A fourth pro-LNA fighter jet, this time the recently restored MiG-23BN serial number "8985", crashed due to technical problems west of Benghazi on 6 July 2016, its pilot colonel Idris Al-Obeidi died in the crash. A fifth pro-LNA fighter jet, this time MiG-23ML serial number 26453, was shot down on 15 January 2017 by the Islamists during its bombing raid on Islamist positions in Ganfouda/Bosnib area, Benghazi, its pilot colonel Younes Aldinali ejected safely. In April 2017, as a response to pro-LNA air force bombing attack on pro-GNA Tamanhint air force base near Sabha in southern Libya on 5 April 2017, pro-GNA L-39ZO Albatros aircraft successfully bombed pro-LNA Brak al-Shati air force base, 80 kilometers north of Sabha, reportedly destroying one pro-LNA MiG-23 fighter jet on the ground. Also, on 29 July 2017, a sixth pro-LNA fighter jet, now MiG-23UB serial number 8008, was shot down by the Islamists during its bombing raid on Islamist positions in the town of Derna. Its pilot Adel Al-Jihani ejected safely but was heavily wounded and then captured by the Islamists; he died of his wounds while in captivity.

Several pro-LNA MiG-21 fighter jets were also lost between 2014 and 2017 – the first pro-LNA MiG-21bis crashed in the city of Tobruk on 2 September 2014 due to pilot error during a pull-up maneuver while performing in a memorial flypast for another pilot, Ibrahim Al-Manifi, who was also killed in a plane crash few days earlier (Islamists claim that they shot it down), killing its pilot Rafa al-Alani and at least one civilian on the ground. Another pro-LNA fighter jet, now MiG-21UM, crashed due to technical problems during takeoff for a training flight on 18 May 2016 at the Tobruk airport, pilot colonel Mohamed Rabie al-Shawa died in the crash while co-pilot captain Abdul Quader Mohamed survived the crash but was injured. On 29 March 2017, another pro-LNA MiG-21bis crashed at the city of Tobruk after returning from a bombing mission against Islamist positions in the town on Derna—its pilot, LNA air brigadier Saleh Joudah, the commander of the Gamal Abdel Nasser Airbase in Tobruk, was killed in the crash, along with four civilians on the ground. A third pro-LNA MiG-21bis was shot down over Al-Sabri district in Benghazi by Islamists on 17 April during a bombing raid against Islamist positions. Another pro-LNA MiG-21 fighter jet was shot down by Islamists MANPADS over the town of Derna on 31 July 2017 during its bombing raid on Islamist positions in the town of Derna, both of its pilots ejected safely and were then captured by the Islamists. Also, on 18 May, pro-GNA militias launched a successful surprise offensive on the pro-LNA Brak al-Shati air force base in the area of Fezzan in southern Libya, killing over 140 pro-LNA soldiers and civilians (of which 40 were executed after being captured), heavily damaging the Brak al-Shati air force base, and also destroyed one inoperable pro-LNA L-39ZO Albatros fighter jet on the ground.

Pro-LNA Libyan air force lost at least six to eight helicopters – Mi-8, Mi-14, Mi-24/Mi-35 and Mi-17 – between 2014 and 2017, most of them crashed due to technical malfunctions, but one pro-LNA Mi-35 combat attack helicopter was shot down at Ras Lanouf and another pro-LNA Mi-35 combat attack helicopter was abandoned by the pro-LNA forces at Ras Lanouf air force base during a pro-GNA militant surprise offensive in March 2017, the helicopter was subsequently destroyed on the ground by the pro-GNA militants to prevent its recapture by the pro-LNA forces. Before that, on 17 July 2016, a pro-LNA air force Mi-17 helicopter was shot down by Islamists with a Chinese-made FN-6 MANPADs near Magrun, 70 kilometers south of Benghazi, killing its entire crew and all personnel on board—three pro-LNA Libyan crew members and three French DGSE special forces intelligence officials.

After suffering heavy losses in aircraft and air force personnel during its campaign against Islamist forces in eastern Libya throughout 2016 and 2017, Haftar's pro-LNA Libyan air force received several MiG-23MLD fighter jets from Russia in February 2017, as well as eight former Egyptian Air Force MiG-21MF fighter jets and at least 10 Mi-8T helicopters from Egypt (in addition to earlier deliveries of dozens of MiG-21MF fighter jets and Mi-8T and Mi-24 helicopters from UAE and Egypt during 2014 and 2015). Egypt and the UAE also provided spare parts, engineers and technicians to the pro-LNA air force, and Egypt provided extensive training of new pro-LNA fighter pilots, as well as reconstruction and modernization of pro-LNA Libyan air force bases. Pakistan also provided training of new pro-LNA fighter pilots between 2015 and 2017. The military support of Egypt and the United Arab Emirates to Haftar's pro-LNA forces went even further than the supply of weapons and other military equipment, as both the Egyptian air force and the United Arab Emirates air force conducted multiple airstrikes on both pro-GNA forces and Islamist positions through eastern Libya between 2015 and 2017.

In April 2019, Haftar's army launched an offensive to take Tripoli from the UN-backed Government of National Accord, during which Air Force planes loyal to the GNA attacked LNA positions. On 8 April 2019, a series of airstrikes was carried out by both pro-LNA and pro-GNA air forces—pro-GNA fighter jets bombed on that day the pro-LNA al-Watiya air force base, 130 kilometers south of Tripoli, and in response to that attack pro-LNA MiG-21 fighter jets launched from that same air force base successfully bombed the pro-GNA Mitiga International Airport in Tripoli, damaging it, and after this pro-LNA bombing raid, the Mitiga International Airport was temporarily closed between 8 April and 10 April—during those airstrikes at Mitiga airport, pro-LNA air forces reportedly damaged one pro-GNA air force CH-47 Chinook helicopter on the ground.

Further airstrikes were made by both pro-GNA and pro-LNA air force aircraft throughout western Libya between 8 April and 13 April, with pro-GNA fighter jets targeting pro-LNA advancing troops near Sirte, Tripoli International Airport, Gharyan and at the outskirts of Tripoli, while pro-LNA fighter jets targeted pro-GNA positions at Misrata, Tripoli International airport and throughout the city of Tripoli. On 10 April, during heavy fighting south of Tripoli, pro-LNA military 166th brigade claimed to have shot down with a ZU-23-2 anti-aircraft gun a pro-GNA L-39ZO Albatros fighter jet, which flew from the Misrata air force base. On 14 April 2019, pro-GNA forces shot down a pro-LNA MiG-21MF in the area of Ain Zara, Tripoli, with a Chinese-made FN-6 MANPADS (pro-LNA forces claim that the aircraft crashed due to technical problems), its pilot Jamal Ben Amer ejected safely and survived, being retrieved by pro-LNA Mi-35 helicopter. On 17 April, pro-LNA forces captured in the Tripoli outskirts from pro-GNA forced several Chinese-made FN-6 MANPADs, confirming the claims that pro-GNA forces have been armed with such advanced anti-aircraft weapons, which were also not previously in use by the Libyan armed forces before the NATO-led intervention in 2011—according to the pro-LNA and Egyptian sources, the Chinese-made FN-6 MANPADs were supplied to pro-GNA forces by Qatar via Sudan.

It was unknown whether that Mirage F-1AD that crashed at al-Watiya air force base on 24 April was shot down by pro-LNA forces, or whether it crashed due to technical problems while repelling the pro-GNA air force attack, but a consensus later emerged that (in the absence of an official refutation of the LNA's claim) the Mirage lost must have been a GNA plane.

On 7 May 2019, pro-Haftar LNA forces shot down with anti-aircraft guns a pro-GNA air force Mirage F1ED at Wadi al-Hira area near Gharyan, south of the Libyan capital of Tripoli; the plane was launched from the pro-GNA Misrata air force base and its pilot, 29-year-old Jimmy Sponaugle, an American mercenary, ejected successfully and survived, and was then captured by pro-LNA forces.

On 12 May, it was confirmed by russian journalists that pro-LNA air forces have during their western Libya offensive extensively used an Il-18D transport aircraft, serial ER-ICS, which is being flown by an unknown foreign company from Kazakhstan (it previously belonged to Moldovan Sky Prim'Air company, and was used by pro-LNA air forces as transport since 2015), for an aerial supply bridge, to regularly transport ammunition from Benina air force base to Gharyan. On 13 June 2019, pro-LNA forces claimed that they shot down a pro-GNA L-39ZO Albatros fighter jet in Dafniya, south of Misrata, as it was bombing pro-LNA positions around the town, however because Dafniya is over 100 kilometers away from the nearest pro-LNA frontline positions, this is highly questionable claim (pro-GNA forces confirmed that they lost the plane, but deny the pro-LNA claim of shooting it down, claiming instead that their L-39ZO fighter jet crashed due to technical malfunction after taking off); the pilot failed to eject, and was killed as a result.

During the first half of June, heavy bombings by both pro-GNA forces and pro-LNA forces continued throughout western Libya, with pro-GNA forces extensively bombing pro-LNA positions, destroying pro-LNA tanks, ammunition depots and troop concentrations – on 19 June 2019., pro-GNA forces claimed that their fighter jets bombed pro-LNA Al Watiya air force base, destroying on the runway a pro-LNA Su-22 fighter bomber just as it was taking off, however this claims remain unconfirmed by independent sources.

Both pro-GNA and pro-LNA air forces suffer serious lack of qualified air force personnel, especially the pro-GNA Libyan air force – most of their pilots are over 50 years old, well above air-force retirement age, and very few have high-quality flight skills. Because of that, and due to many of its Libyan-born pilots and air force personnel being killed in the war, both sides, especially pro-GNA air forces, are relying more and more on foreign mercenaries to both fly and repair their fighter jets, with mixed results. Many of these foreign mercenaries fighting for pro-GNA forces are from countries such as Portugal, Ecuador, US, Turkey and Ukraine, while fighter jets from pro-LNA forces are reportedly being flown by mercenaries from UAE, Egypt and Russia.

== Military airports ==
Military air force bases include:

- Al-Jufra Air Base (near Hun)
- Al-Watiya Air Base (50 km south of Zuwara)
- Benina (near Benghazi)
- Gamal Abdel Nasser Airbase (near Tobruk): formerly RAF Station El-Adem, 1942–1970.
- Ghadames Airport
- Ghardabiya Air Base near Sirte
- Ghat Airport
- Al Abraq International Airport (near Bayda)
- Maaten al-Sarra Air Base
- Misrata Airport
- Mitiga (near Tripoli): formerly USAF Wheelus Air Base, 1948–1970.
- Sabha Air Base

== Aircraft ==
=== Current inventories ===
Government of National Unity (internationally recognized)
Aircraft	Origin	Image	Type	Variant	Quantity	Notes
Combat aircraft
Mikoyan-Gurevich MiG-23	Soviet Union		Fighter-bomber	BN	2	
Mirage F1	France		Attack aircraft		2	Updated to a high standard in 2021
Sukhoi Su-24	Russia		Bomber	MK	2	
Soko J-21 Jastreb	Yugoslavia		Attack		1	Serviceability doubtful.
TAI Hürkuş	Turkey		Attack	C	12	
Aero L-39 Albatros (Tamenhant)	Czechoslovakia; Libya		Attack aircraft Fighter aircraft	Tamenhant	10+	Libyan upgraded variant of the L-39 incorporating local manufacturing parts and an Italian supervised engine.
Military transport aircraft
C-130	United States		Military transport	Hercules	1+	One recovered from Malaysia in 2024
Helicopters
Mil Mi-24	Soviet Union		Attack		?	
Mil Mi-17	Soviet Union		Transport		?	
Mi-35 Hind-E	Russia		Attack		2	
AW101	Italy		Multirole		1	
Trainer aircraft
Soko G-2 Galeb	Yugoslavia		Jet trainer / Light attack		3	
Aero L-39 Albatros	Czechoslovakia		Jet trainer / Light attack	ZO	5	
SIAI-Marchetti SF.260	Italy		Trainer / Light attack	ML	1+	
Unmanned aerial vehicles
Baykar Bayraktar Akıncı	Turkey		Unmanned combat aerial vehicle		3	One crashed in January 2025.
Baykar Bayraktar TB2	Turkey		Unmanned combat aerial vehicle		30	Several were lost during the Libyan crisis.
TAI Anka-S	Turkey		Unmmaned combat airial vehicle		12	
Kargu-2	Turkey	N/A	Loitering munition		7	
Mavic 3	Ukraine		Unmanned combat aerial vehicle			
UJ-26	Ukraine	N/A	Loitering munition		26	Seen in Zawiya

Libyan National Army (HoR backed)
Aircraft	Origin	Images	Type	Variant	Quantity	Notes
Combat aircraft
Mikoyan-Gurevich MiG-21	Soviet Union		Fighter	MF	10	
Mikoyan-Gurevich MiG-23	Soviet Union		Fighter	ML/BN	2-3	
Mirage F-1	France		Fighter-bomber	AD/ED	2	
Sukhoi Su-22	Soviet Union		Fighter-bomber	UM3	1	
CAC/PAC JF-17 Thunder	China; Pakistan		Multirole	JF-17 Block 3	0	16 on order
Military transport aircraft
Ilyushin Il-76	Russia		Military transport	TD	3	
Helicopters
Mil Mi-24	Soviet Union		Attack	Mi-24/Mi-35	?	
Aérospatiale Gazelle	France		Utility	SA 341	Up to 3	
Eurocopter AS332 Super Puma	France		Transport		Up to 3	
Mil Mi-8	Soviet Union		Transport	Mi-8/Mi-17	?	
Trainer aircraft
Mikoyan-Gurevich MiG-21	Soviet Union		Jet trainer	UM	1+	
Aero L-39 Albatros	Czechoslovakia		Jet trainer / Light attack	ZO	10	
SIAI-Marchetti SF.260	Italy		Trainer / Light attack	ML	8	
Unmanned aerial vehicles
CAIG Wing Loong	China		Unmanned combat aerial vehicle		80	
CAIG Wing Loong II	China		Unmanned combat aerial vehicle		10	
Qods Mohajer	Iran		Reconnaissance	Mohajer-4	12	
Orlan-10	Russia		Reconnaissance		10	

=== Surface-to-air missiles ===
- 2K12 Kub – 50 operational

== See also ==
- National Transitional Council
  - Free Libyan Air Force – the air force of the National Transitional Council, a collection of defected Loyalist Military personnel and captured aircraft that aligned themselves with the anti-Gaddafi forces in the Libyan Civil War.
