= Gulf of Sidra incident (1981) =

Air battle between Libya and the US in the Mediterranean

- Part of the Cold War
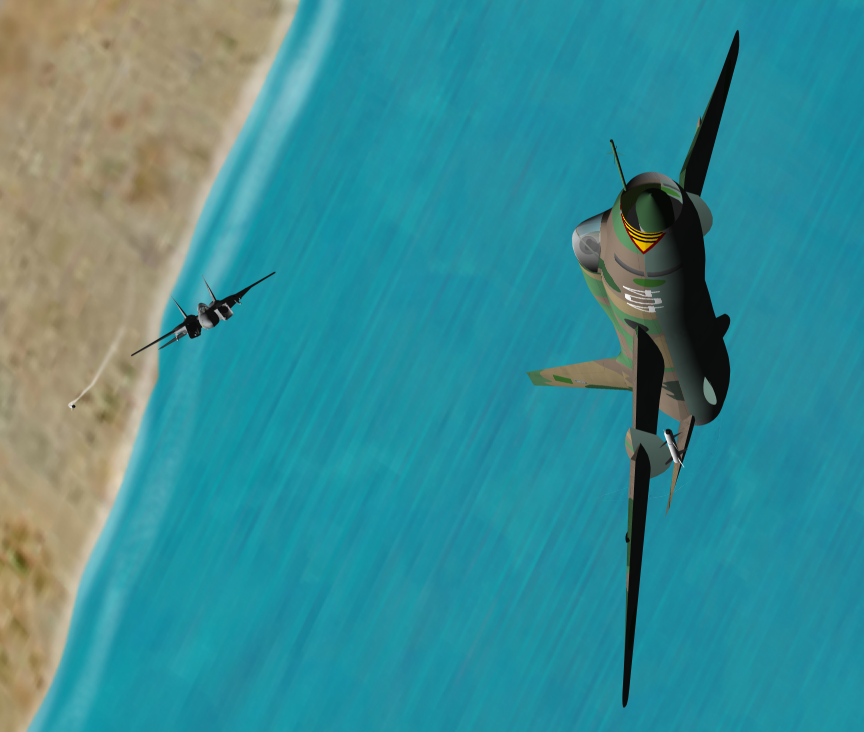
- A CGI recreation of Fast Eagle 107's AIM-9L Sidewinder about to hit a Libyan Su-22M3 over Gulf of Sidra.
Date	19 August 1981
Location	Gulf of Sidra, Mediterranean Sea
Result	US Victory: Two Su-22M3 shot down

Belligerents
United States	Libya

Commanders and leaders
(United States) Ronald Reagan	(History of Libya under Muammar Gaddafi) Muammar Gaddafi

Strength
2 F-14A Tomcats; 1 E-2C Hawkeye; 1 aircraft carrier (Nimitz Class)	2 Su-22M3s; GCI radar stations

Casualties and losses
None	2 aircraft destroyed

In the first Gulf of Sidra incident, 19 August 1981, two Libyan Sukhoi Su-22M3 Fitter-G fired upon two U.S. Grumman F-14A Tomcats and were subsequently shot down off the Libyan coast. Libya had claimed that the entire Gulf was their territory, at 32° 30′ N, with an exclusive 62-nautical-mile (115 km; 71 mi) fishing zone, which Libyan leader Muammar Gaddafi asserted as "The Line of Death" in 1973. Two further incidents occurred in the area in 1986 and in 1989.

== Background ==
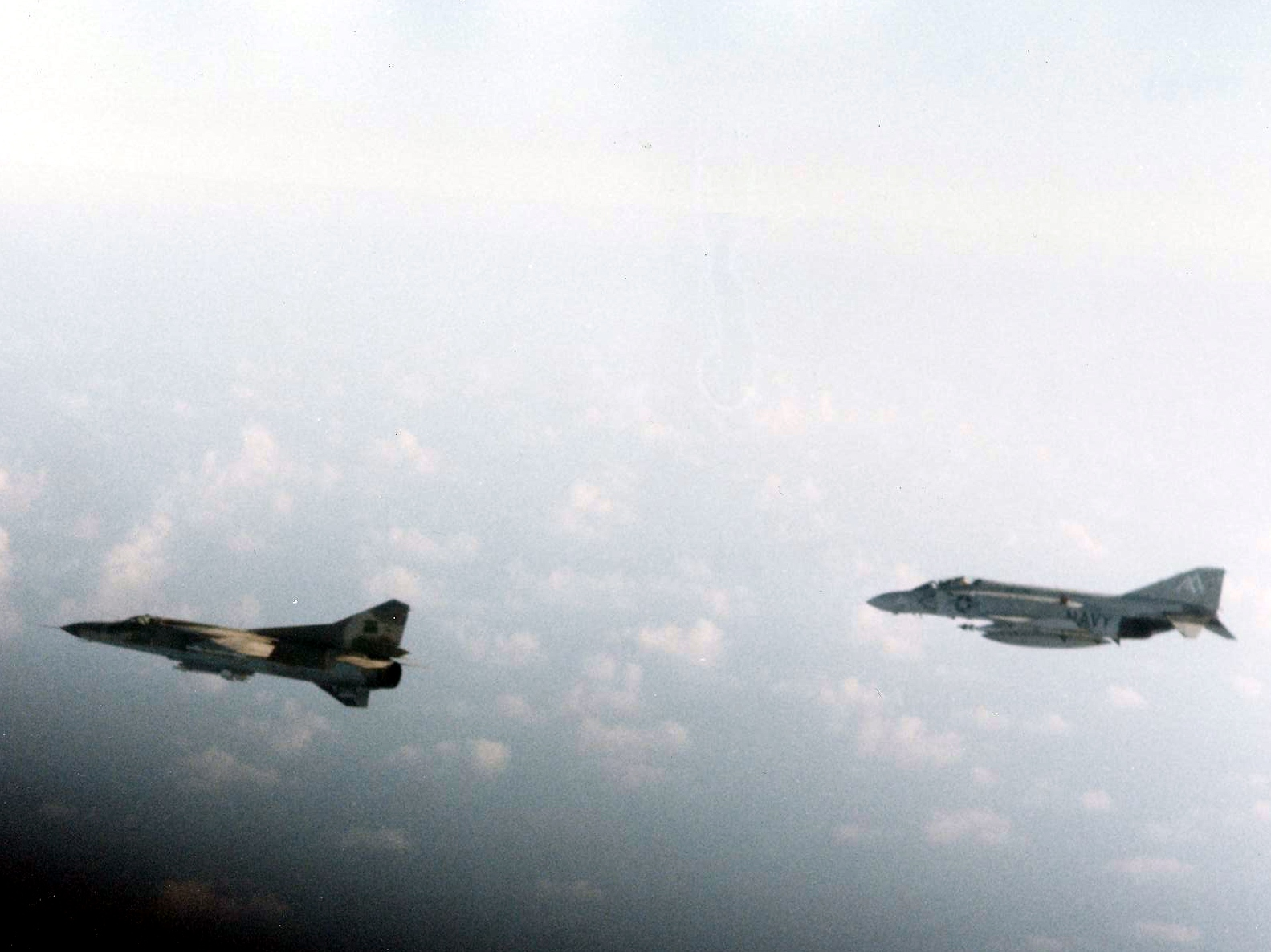
A U.S. Navy McDonnell F-4J Phantom II of Fighter Squadron VF-74 "Be-Devilers" escorting a Libyan Mikoyan-Gurevich MiG-23 over the Gulf of Sidra in August 1981.

In 1973, Libya claimed the Gulf of Sidra as a closed bay and part of its territorial waters. This prompted the United States to conduct Freedom of Navigation (FON) operations in the area since the claim did not meet the criteria established by the international law. Libya often confronted U.S. forces in and near the gulf, and on two occasions its fighter jets opened fire on U.S. reconnaissance flights off the Libyan coast; once in early 1973 and again in late 1980. FON operations intensified when Ronald Reagan became president.

In August 1981, Reagan authorized a large naval force led by a pair of U.S. Navy aircraft carriers, USS Forrestal and USS Nimitz, to deploy to the disputed area. The two carriers had embarked a total of four interceptor squadrons: VF-74 "Be-Devilers" and VMFA-115 "Silver Eagles", flying F-4 Phantoms from Forrestal, and the VF-41 "Black Aces" and VF-84 "Jolly Rogers", flying F-14 Tomcats from Nimitz. The Libyan Air Force responded by deploying a high number of interceptors and fighter-bombers.

Early in the morning of 18 August, when the U.S. exercise began, at least three MiG-25 "Foxbats" approached the U.S. carrier groups and were escorted away by American interceptors. The Libyans tried to establish the exact location of the U.S. naval force. Thirty-five pairs of MiG-23 "Floggers", MiG-25s, Sukhoi Su-20 "Fitter-Cs", Su-22M "Fitter-Js" and Mirage F1s flew into the area, and were soon intercepted by seven pairs of F-14s and F-4s. U.S. Naval Intelligence later assessed that a MiG-25 may have fired a missile from 18 miles (29 km) away at U.S. fighter aircraft that day.

== Incident ==
On the morning of 19 August, after having diverted a number of Libyan "mock" attacks on the battle group the previous day, two F-14s from VF-41 "Black Aces", Fast Eagle 102 (CDR Henry 'Hank' Kleemann/LT David 'DJ' Venlet) (flying BuNo 160403) and Fast Eagle 107 (LT Lawrence 'Music' Muczynski/LTJG James 'Luca' Anderson) (in BuNo 160390), were flying a combat air patrol (CAP), ostensibly to cover aircraft engaged in a missile exercise. However, U.S. Navy Commander Thompson S. Sanders wrote in Air & Space/Smithsonian that his S-3A Viking's mission was the real precursor to this incident. Sanders was ordered to fly his Viking in a "racetrack" orbit (oval pattern) inside Gaddafi's claimed zone but outside the internationally recognized 12-mile (19 km) territorial water limit to try to provoke the Libyans to react. An E-2C Hawkeye alerted Sanders that two Sukhoi Su-22 fighters had taken off from Ghurdabiyah Air Base near the city of Sirte.

The Hawkeye directed the F-14s to intercept. Sanders dove to an altitude of 500 feet (150 m) and flew north to evade the Libyan aircraft, an experience Sanders found stressful because the S-3A was not equipped with a threat warning receiver, nor with any countermeasures, a deficiency later remedied on the S-3B. The two F-14s set up for an intercept as the contacts headed north towards them. Only a few seconds before the crossing, at an estimated distance of 300 m, one of the Libyans fired an AA-2 "Atoll" at one of the F-14s, but missed.

The two Su-22s split as they flew past the Americans, the leader turning to the northwest and the wingman turning southeast in the direction of the Libyan coast. The Tomcats evaded the missile and were cleared to return fire by their rules of engagement, which mandated self-defense on the initiation of hostile action. The Tomcats turned hard port and came behind the Libyan jets. The Americans fired AIM-9L Sidewinders; the first kill was credited to Fast Eagle 102, the second to Fast Eagle 107. Both Libyan pilots ejected.

Prior to the ejections, a U.S. electronic surveillance plane monitoring the event recorded the lead Libyan pilot reporting to his ground controller that he had fired a missile at one of the U.S. fighters and gave no indication that the missile shot was unintended. The official U.S. Navy report states that both Libyan pilots ejected and were safely recovered, but in the official audio recording of the incident taken from USS Biddle, one of the F-14 pilots states that he saw a Libyan pilot eject, but his parachute failed to open.

Less than an hour later, while the Libyans were conducting a search-and-rescue operation for their downed pilots, two MiG-25s entered the airspace over the Gulf. They headed towards the U.S. carriers at Mach 1.5 and conducted a mock attack in the direction of USS Nimitz. Two VF-41 Tomcats headed towards the Libyans, which then turned around. The Tomcats turned home, but had to turn around again when the Libyans headed towards the U.S. carriers once more. After being tracked by the F-14s' radars, the MiGs finally headed home. One more Libyan formation ventured out into the Gulf towards the U.S. forces later that day.

== Aftermath ==
Fast Eagle 102 (BuNo 160403) is now on display at the Commemorative Air Force Museum in Midland, Texas. The restored F-14 was unveiled in a ceremony in August 2016. Vice Admiral Dave Venlet cut the first tape.

Fast Eagle 107 (BuNo 160390) was destroyed in an accident on 25 October 1994. The plane crashed into the ocean after suffering a compressor stall in the port engine during landing. The radar intercept officer ejected safely but its pilot, Kara Hultgreen, did not survive. Parts of the plane were salvaged weeks later.

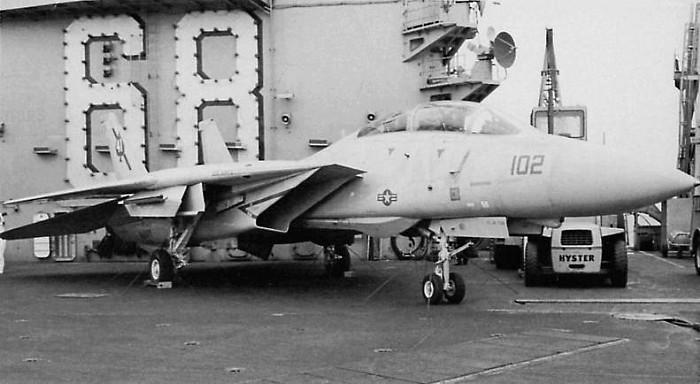
Fast Eagle 102, one of the two F-14 Tomcats on the deck of the USS Nimitz immediately following the incident

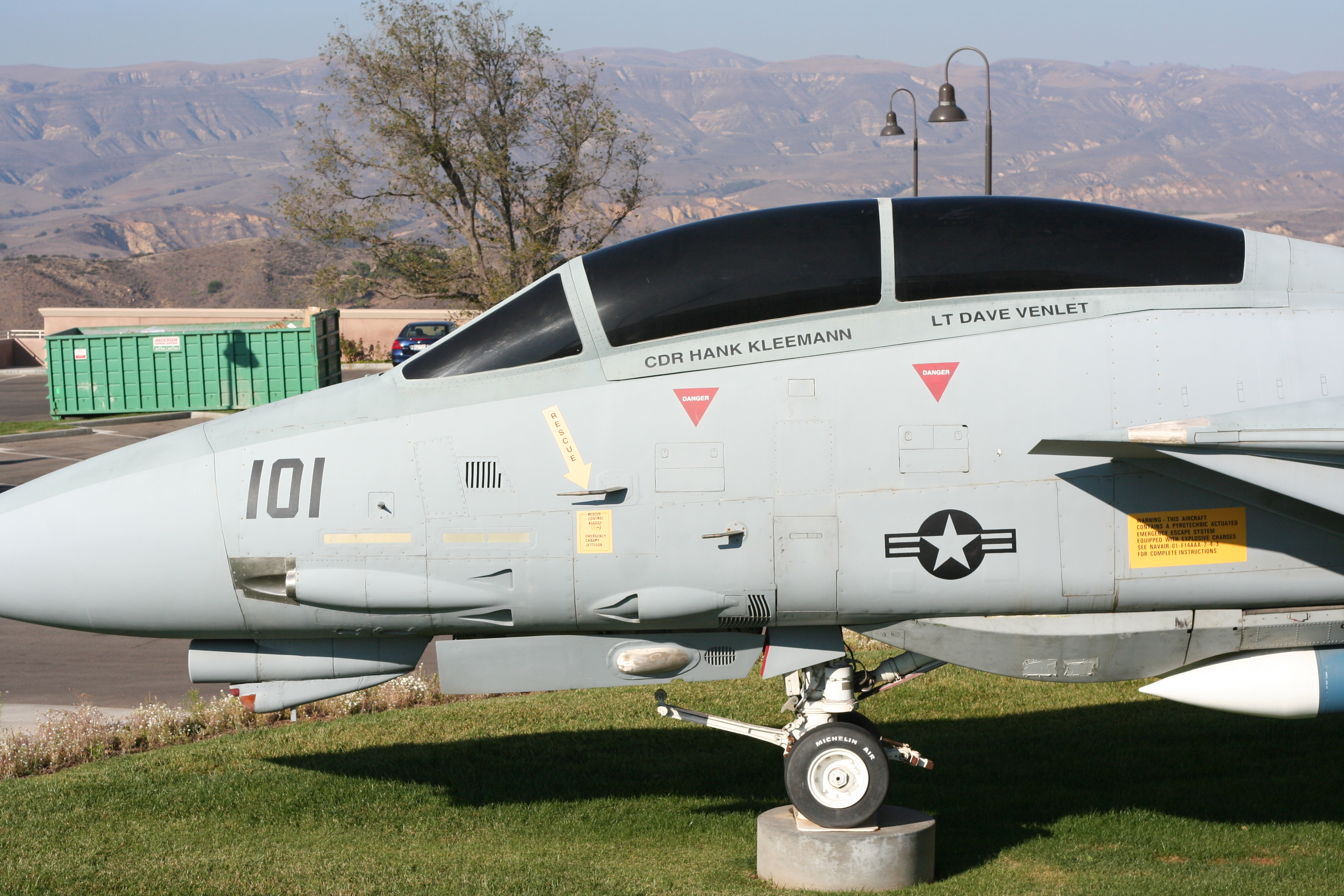
F-14 BuNo 162592, painted to depict the F-14 (BuNo 160403) flown by Kleemann and Venlet on display at the Ronald Reagan Presidential Library in Simi Valley, California

== See also ==
- Action in the Gulf of Sidra (1986)
- 1989 air battle near Tobruk, a similar incident which occurred eight years later
- Iron Eagle, a 1986 film inspired by the incident.
- Operation El Dorado Canyon (1986)
- Top Gun, a 1986 film whose final dogfight scene was inspired by this incident.
