= VFA-41 =

Strike Fighter Squadron 41
- Founded: 1 September 1950; 76 years ago
- Country: United States
- Branch: United States Navy
- Type: Fighter/Attack
- Role: Close air support Air interdiction Aerial reconnaissance
- Part of: Carrier Air Wing Nine
- Garrison/HQ: NAS Lemoore
- Nickname: "Black Aces"
- Mottos: First to Fight, First to Strike
- Mascot: Chucker
- Equipment: F/A-18F Super Hornet
- Engagements: Cuban Missile Crisis; Vietnam War; Iranian Hostage Crisis; Gulf of Sidra incident (1981); Multinational Force in Lebanon; Gulf War; Operation Provide Comfort; Operation Deliberate Force; Operation Deny Flight; Operation Southern Watch; Operation Allied Force; Operation Enduring Freedom; Iraq War; Operation Inherent Resolve; 2024 Iran–Israel conflict Operation Prosperity Guardian; Operation Poseidon Archer; Operation Epic Fury
- Decorations: COMNAVAIRLANT Safety "S" Award, 1975; COMNAVAIRLANT Safety "S" Award, 1981; COMNAVAIRLANT Safety "S" Award, 1989; COMNAVAIRLANT Safety "S" Award, 1992; Battle Efficiency "E", 1981; Battle Efficiency "E", 1985; Battle Efficiency "E", 1989; Wade McClusky Award, 1999

Commanders
- Commanding Officer: CDR Michael McBryar
- Executive Officer: CDR Taylor Rives
- Command Master Chief: CMDCM. Dan Boes

Aircraft flown
- Fighter: F2H-3 Banshee; F3H-2 Demon; F-4B Phantom II; F-14A Tomcat; F/A-18F Super Hornet

Strike Fighter Squadron 41 (VFA-41) also known as the "Black Aces", is a United States Navy strike fighter squadron based at Naval Air Station Lemoore, California, flying the F/A-18F Super Hornet. They are attached to Carrier Air Wing 9 (CVW-9). Their radio callsign is "Dealer" and their tailcode is NG.

The unit patch is seen worn by Monica Barbaro in Top Gun: Maverick.

== History ==
=== 1950s ===
VF-41 was established on 1 September 1950 at NAS Oceana, it is the fourth US Navy squadron to be designated VF-41. The Black Aces began flying the F2H-3 Banshee in 1953, deploying to the Mediterranean and Far East aboard USS Independence. On 24 January 1956, VF-41 embarked with ATG-181 for the shakedown cruise of USS Forrestal near Guantanamo Bay Cuba, returning to NAS Oceana on 31 March 1956. VF-41 again attached to ATG-181 embarked aboard USS Bennington on October 3, 1956 for a Western Pacific deployment. The crew observed the 15th anniversary of "Battle of the Coral Sea" with ceremony at location of the battle conducted by veterans of the battle. ATG-181 returned to NAS Oceana on May 23, 1957. In 1959, the Banshee was replaced by the F3H-2 Demon.

=== 1960s ===
In February 1962, VF-41 transitioned to the F-4B Phantom II and made a special deployment to NAS Key West, Florida during the Cuban Missile Crisis. In May 1965, the squadron deployed to the western Pacific for seven months of combat operations during the Vietnam War. They flew a wide range of missions: fighter cover, reconnaissance escort, flak suppression and day/night interdiction.

=== 1970s ===
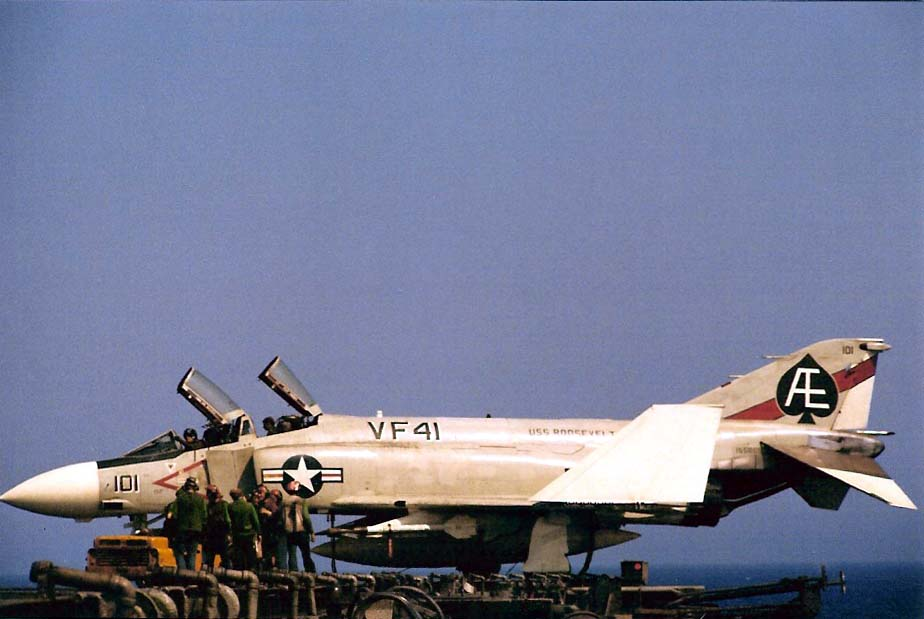
VF-41 F-4J on USS Franklin D. Roosevelt

The next five deployments (flying the F-4J, B, N) were on USS Franklin D. Roosevelt with CVW-6 tail code AE (awarded the Navy Meritorious Unit Commendation for period 9 March 1972 through 1 December 1972). VF-41 transitioned from the F-4B to the F-4J in 1973 and (as an 18 aircraft squadron) was on USS Franklin D. Roosevelt during the Yom Kippur War providing escorts for Operation Nickel Grass and were part of the peacekeeping force that helped keep the truce after the war.

In 1974, VF-41 transitioned from the F-4B to the F-4N and conducted their last cruise with the Phantom aboard Franklin D. Roosevelt in 1975. During that year VF-41 was awarded the COMNAVAIRLANT Safety "S", which they also would receive in 1981, 1989 and 1992. In April 1976 VF-41 transitioned to the F-14A Tomcat and their first cruise began in September 1977 as part of CVW-8 on USS Nimitz. Another cruise followed in 1980 to the Mediterranean.

=== 1980s ===
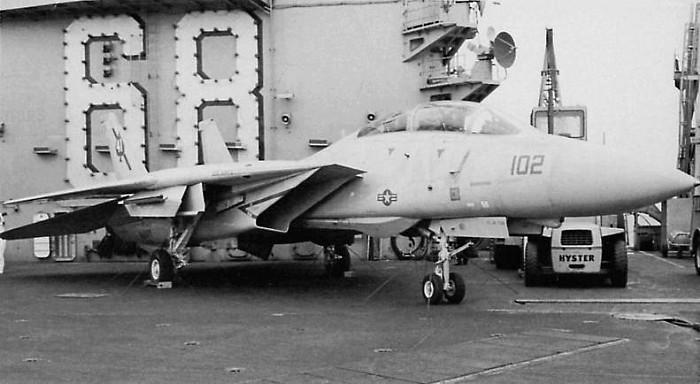
Fast Eagle 102, one of the F-14 Tomcats involved in the Gulf of Sidra incident, on the deck of USS Nimitz

In 1980, Nimitz and VF-41 took part in a round-the-Horn cruise. While on this cruise, the carrier served as the seaborne base in response to the Iran hostage crisis and the subsequent attempted rescue of the U.S. Embassy hostages from Iran. VF-41 (and the rest of the battle group) spent 144 continuous days at sea, the longest period the squadron had spent at sea without break since World War II.

During workups for the 1981–1982 Mediterranean cruise, an EA-6B Prowler piloted by Marine Lieut. Steven E. White, crashed on the deck of Nimitz. Upon crashing onto the deck, the Prowler rammed broadside into six fueled F-14 Tomcats causing a fuel fire and ordnance to explode, including an AIM-7 Sparrow missile. The incident, which caused only superficial damage to Nimitz, resulted in three F-14s destroyed, 45 injured sailors and fourteen casualties with VF-41 losing three shipmates.

While on deployment in the Mediterranean on 19 August 1981, during a routine combat air patrol mission over the Gulf of Sidra, two Libyan Su-22 "Fitter" aircraft were shot down by squadron aircraft. The incident marked the first Navy air combat confrontation since the Vietnam War and the first ever for the F-14A Tomcat. It was the first time a variable wing geometry aircraft shot down another variable wing geometry aircraft. 1981 was also the first year in which the squadron won the COMNAVAIRLANT Battle Efficiency "E", signifying them as the most efficient squadron in the Atlantic Fleet. VF-41 was also awarded the Battle "E" in 1985 and 1989.

In November 1982, the squadron embarked on an extended deployment off the coast of Beirut, Lebanon, in support of the Multinational Force in Lebanon.

During 1985, VF-41 spent 68 days off the coast of Lebanon in response to the hijacking of TWA Flight 847.

The 1986 cruise was the last with Nimitz; it began in December and ended in June 1987 when Nimitz got to her new home in San Diego. In October that year, CVW-8 was deployed with USS Theodore Roosevelt and the first cruise was in the North Atlantic for Exercise Teamwork ’88 which involved operations with the Royal Norwegian Air Force and the first Mediterranean deployment was in December.

=== 1990s ===
On 28 December 1990, VF-41 embarked on USS Theodore Roosevelt to support Operation Desert Shield, arriving in the Persian Gulf shortly after hostilities with Iraq began. By the end of the war, the squadron had amassed over 1,500 combat flight hours. After the war, the squadron remained in the Persian Gulf and Red Sea as part of a military presence enforcing the ceasefire until late April 1991, when the squadron was tasked with providing air support for ground forces assisting Kurdish refugees in Northern Iraq during Operation Provide Comfort.

VF-41 was soon training for the F-14's new role: air-to-ground bombing. In late 1991, VF-41 had flown over 46,500 hours without an accident over a period of 11 years.

In 1995 VF-84 was disestablished and VF-41 picked up the TARPS mission. The disestablishment of VF-84 was the only occasion in which a TARPS capable unit was disestablished instead of a non-TARPS capable unit.

In early 1995 VF-41 deployed on a six-month deployment to the Mediterranean Sea, Red Sea, Arabian Sea, Persian Gulf and the Adriatic Sea. During this cruise VF-41 conducted combat operations in support of Operation Deliberate Force and Operation Deny Flight over Bosnia and Herzegovina and Operation Southern Watch over Iraq. On 5 September 1995, two VF-41 F-14As dropped laser-guided bombs for the first time in combat during Operation Deliberate Force. The target was an ammunition dump in eastern Bosnia. The bombs were guided by F/A-18s. VF-41 adopted the slogan "First To Fight, First To Strike" in recognition of being the first F-14 squadron to score air-to-air kills and drop bombs in combat. During this deployment VF-41 logged over 600 combat hours and 530 sorties, and during a week of combat in the Balkans (5–12 September 1995), VF-41 dropped 24,000 pounds of ordnance on Bosnian-Serb targets, the bulk of it precision guided bombs laser designated by F/A-18 Hornets.

In 1996, VF-14 joined VF-41 in CVW-8 and thus CVW-8 was one of few air wings in the US Navy with two F-14 squadrons, rather than one. CVW-8 deployed on board USS John C. Stennis in February 1996, for a Joint Fleet Exercise. This was followed by deployed operations to the North Atlantic while embarked on USS John F. Kennedy with port calls to Dublin, Ireland and Portsmouth, England.

In April 1997, CVW-8 embarked on USS John F. Kennedy for a Mediterranean/Persian Gulf deployment. During this deployment, CVW-8 participated in numerous exercises and detachments including Infinite Acclaim, Beacon Flash and Invitex. During Invitex the Air Wing completed over 350 sorties including 203 sorties in a single day of surge operations. This deployment also included operations over Bosnia-Herzegovina in support of Operation Deliberate Guard and over Iraq in support of Operation Southern Watch.

In 1999, USS Theodore Roosevelt departed for the Mediterranean and joined NATO forces for Operation Allied Force. VF-41's first strike was against an ammunition storage facility in Pristina, Kosovo on 6 April. In July, Theodore Roosevelt was ordered to the Persian Gulf in support of Operation Southern Watch, where VF-41 became the first squadron to expend ordnance in two theatres on a single deployment. VF-41 logged over 1,100 combat hours during 384 sorties and dropped over 160 tons of laser-guided munitions with an unprecedented 85% success rate in support of Operation Allied Force and Operation Southern Watch.

The squadron won the Wade McClusky Award in 1999, as most outstanding attack squadron in the US Navy. This marked the first time an F-14 squadron won the award, which previously been given only to A-6 and F/A-18 units.

=== 2000s ===
In April 2001, VF-41 embarked on their final F-14 cruise aboard USS Enterprise, supporting Operation Southern Watch and Operation Enduring Freedom (OEF). As the carrier headed for home, they were given order to head to the Gulf of Oman after the September 11 attacks. During the build-up to war, VF-41 conducted several TARPS missions near the Pakistani/Afghani-border.

USS Enterprise and its air group was the night carrier during OEF and thus did not see action until 8 October, when VF-41 attacked several cave complexes. One of the first target hit was the Shindand airbase, in western Afghanistan, where the Taliban were storing aircraft, radar and vehicles. By the end of the deployment in November, VF-41 had dropped over 200,000 lbs of ordnance (202 laser-guided bombs).

Shortly after their return in late 2001, VF-41 transitioned to the F/A-18F Super Hornet and was redesignated VFA-41.

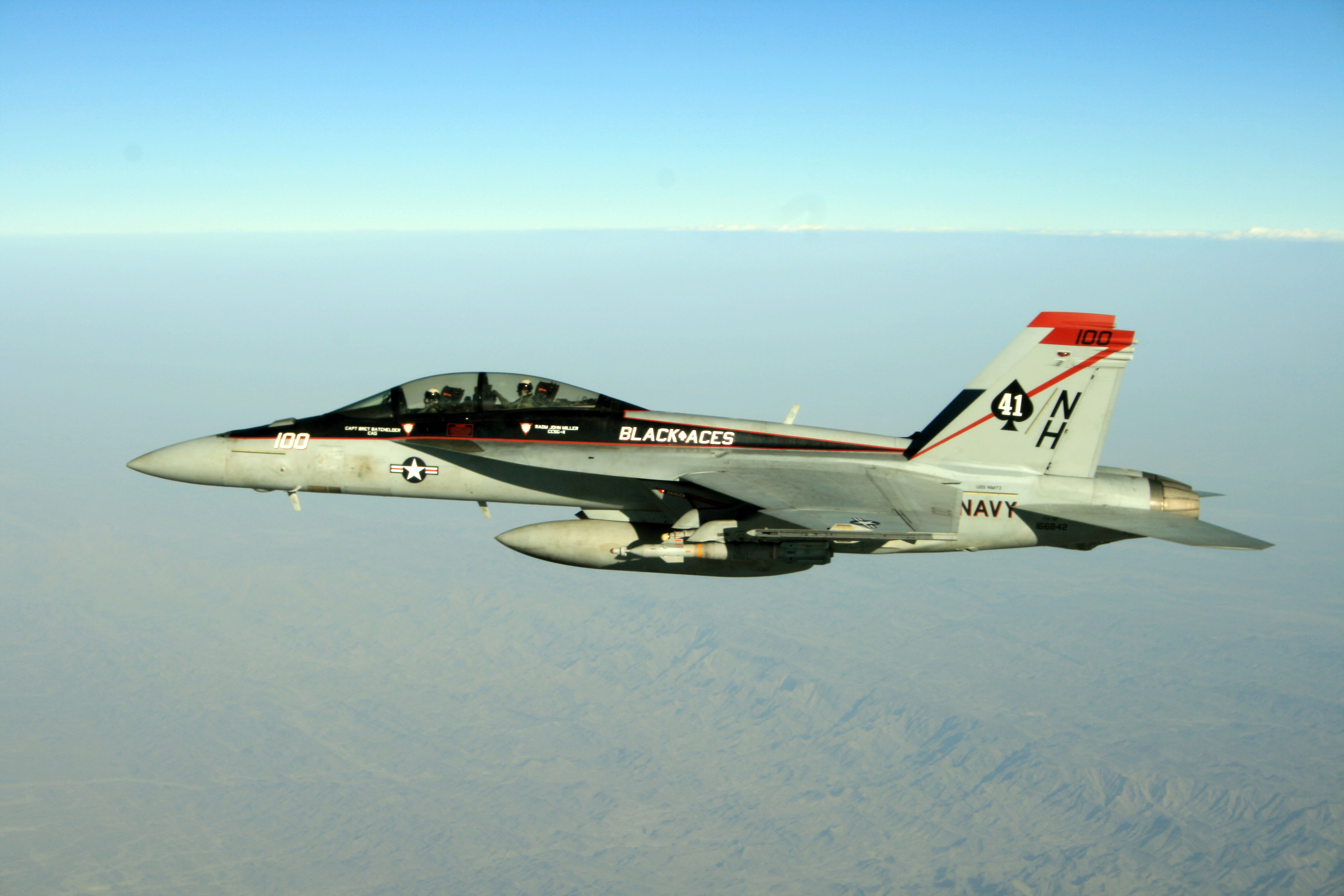
VFA-41 F/A-18F over Afghanistan

On 18 October 2002 four VFA-41 aviators were killed when two F/A-18Fs collided in mid-air off the coast of California.

During Operation Iraqi Freedom, two F/A-18Fs were forward deployed to USS Abraham Lincoln in late March 2003. These F/A-18s were requested to boost the aerial refueling capabilities of CVW-14, as well as to provide additional qualified Forward Air Controllers. The F/A-18s flew from Nimitz to Abraham Lincoln, a 2700-mile trip. On 6 April, the Hornets returned to Nimitz. During the war VFA-41 expended laser-guided bombs, as well as JDAM and AGM-65 Maverick missiles.

In May 2005 VFA-41 again deployed to the Persian Gulf in support of Operation Iraqi Freedom. During this deployment the squadron was featured in the PBS documentary "Carrier" with a heavy focus on Commander David Fravor.

In 2007 VFA-41 deployed aboard Nimitz for a WESTPAC cruise and participated in Operation Valiant Shield, a joint-force exercise in the vicinity of Guam.

In January 2008 the squadron surge-deployed to Nimitz in the Pacific. On 13 February 2008, it was reported that several Russian Tu-95 bombers were intercepted over the Pacific by F/A-18s from Nimitz while on a surge deployment in the region. One Tu-95 was escorted and flew directly over the carrier at 2,000 feet (610 m), escorted by VFA-41 Hornets. The Chief of Naval Operations, Adm. Gary Roughead called the incident "benign" and said: "they came out to look. We joined up (and) flew with them until they went home". A total of four Russian bombers were involved; two remained about 500 miles east of the carrier strike group, and another orbited about 50 miles away as one Tu-95 did two low passes over the Nimitz carrier group.

After their return to the United States, VFA-41 began trading in their Lot 26 F/A-18Fs for Lot 30 F/A-18Fs which are fitted with AESA radar technology.

During 2009 CVW-11 and the Nimitz Strike Group conducted several training exercises off the coast of Southern California including composite unit training and joint task force training in anticipation for their 2009–2010 deployment. On 28 July it was reported that CVW-11 and the Nimitz Strike Group was to depart for an eight-month deployment.

=== 2010s ===
By January 2010 VFA-41 had flown over 2,500 combat hours in 400 combat missions supporting Operation Enduring Freedom. VFA-41 joined CVW-9 in 2010 and started workups for a WESTPAC deployment in 2011.

From 27 July 2011 to 26 February 2012, CVW-9 deployed on board USS John C. Stennis to support operations in Iraq and Afghanistan, counter-piracy and maritime security operations. VFA-41 supported Operation Enduring Freedom and the final combat missions of Operation New Dawn.

Following a short six-month turnaround, the squadron once again cruised on a surge deployment from 1 September 2012 to 28 April 2013 on board USS John C. Stennis. The squadron returned to the Middle East and flew missions in support of the 5th Fleet and Operation Enduring Freedom.

In January 2016 VFA-41 with Carrier Air Wing 9 deployed aboard John C. Stennis to the South China Sea to ensure freedom of navigation. Ports of call during this deployment included Guam, Busan, Singapore, Manila and Pearl Harbor. The squadron flew out to its landbase at Lemoore, California on 9 August. VFA-41 conducted combat flights in support of Operations Inherent Resolve, Resolute Support and Freedom Sentinel over Afghanistan, Iraq, and Syria. Carrier Air Wing NINE squadrons returned to NAS Lemoore, North Island, Point Mugu, and Whidbey Island in May 2019.

=== 2020s ===
During the 2020s, the squadron was a part of Carrier Air Wing 9 on the USS Abraham Lincoln.

In March 2020, the U.S. Navy discharged an aviation machinist mate's apprentice serving with the unit after technology news website Gizmodo discovered they had previously been a "prolific recruiter" for the international neo-Nazi paramilitary network Atomwaffen Division. Commander Ron Flanders, then spokesperson for Naval Air Forces Pacific Fleet, told Gizmodo that members of hate groups are "not welcome" in the unit or the Navy.

In early August 2024, the squadron was deployed on the USS Abraham Lincoln in response to heightened tensions between Iran and Israel. While in the CENTCOM theater, VFA-41 conducted extensive combat operations.

In late Feb 2026, as part of CVW-9, VFA-41 and their F/A-18Fs operating off the USS Abraham Lincoln, undertook combat sorties within Operation Epic Fury against Iran.

== See also ==
- Naval aviation
- Modern US Navy carrier air operations
- List of United States Navy aircraft squadrons
- List of Inactive United States Navy aircraft squadrons
