= 1989 air battle near Tobruk =

1989 air battle between Libyan and US aircraft

1989 Air Battle Near Tobruk, Libya
- Part of the Cold War
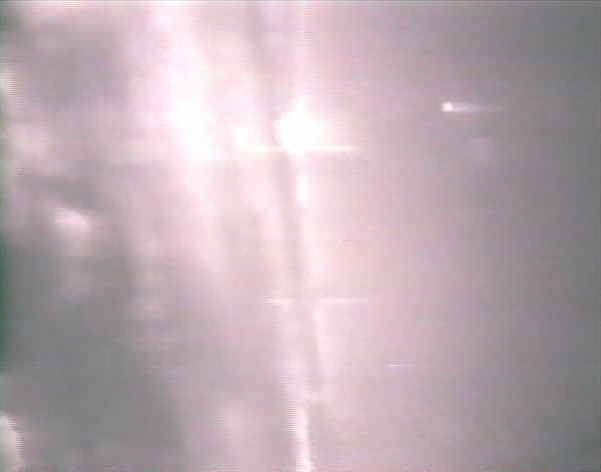
- Gun camera still of the lead F-14A showing the second MiG-23ML exploding after being hit by an AIM-9L Sidewinder missile
Date	4 January 1989
Location	Mediterranean Sea 33.5°N 23.4°E
Result	U.S. victory: Two Libyan MiG-23ML fighters shot down

Belligerents
United States	Libya

Commanders and leaders
Ronald Reagan	Muammar Gaddafi

Strength
2 F-14A Tomcats; 1 E-2C Hawkeye	2 MiG-23ML

Casualties and losses
None	2 pilots missing 2 MiG-23ML destroyed

On 4 January 1989, two Grumman F-14A Tomcats of the United States Navy shot down two Libyan-operated Mikoyan-Gurevich MiG-23ML Flogger-G which the American aircrews believed were attempting to engage and attack them, as had happened eight years prior during the 1981 Gulf of Sidra incident. The engagement took place over the Mediterranean Sea, about 40 miles (64 km) north of Tobruk, Libya.

== Background ==
In 1973, Libya claimed much of the Gulf of Sidra (south of Latitude 31° 30′) as its territorial waters and subsequently declared a "line of death", the crossing of which would invite a military response. The United States did not recognize Libya's territorial claims and continued to challenge the line, leading to military hostilities in August 1981 and March 1986. A terrorist attack in West Berlin which killed two American soldiers and one Turkish civilian on 5 April 1986 was linked to Libya and prompted the U.S. to carry out retaliatory air strikes against targets in Libya ten days later.

Attempts by Libya to obtain weapons of mass destruction were of great concern to U.S. President Ronald Reagan's administration since it viewed Libya as a state sponsor of terrorism. Tensions between Libya and the U.S. were running high after the latter accused Libya of building a chemical weapons plant near Rabta in the fall of 1988. During a December 1988 press interview, Reagan indicated the potential for military action to destroy the plant. The possibility of a U.S. attack caused Libya to increase its air defenses around Rabta and its state of military readiness throughout the country.

== Engagement ==
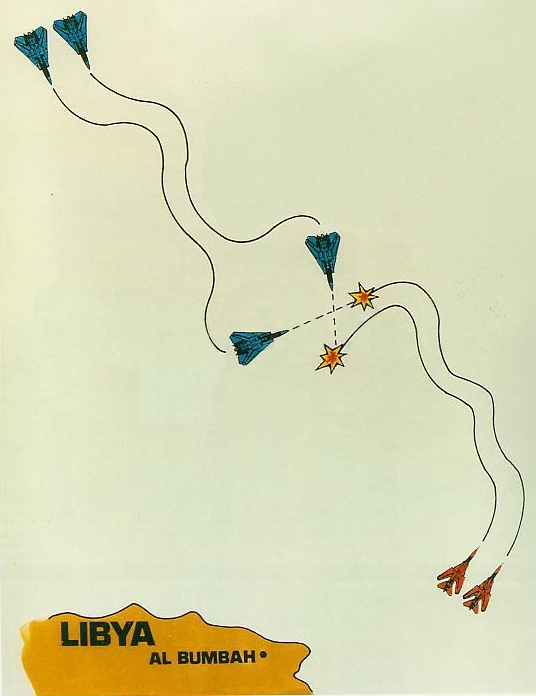
A simplified depiction of the incident

On the morning of 4 January 1989, the aircraft carrier USS John F. Kennedy was sailing toward the eastern Mediterranean Sea for a scheduled port visit to Haifa, Israel. The carrier was over 120 miles (190 km) north of Libya and had aircraft operating roughly 80 miles (130 km) north of the country. Aircraft operating from the Kennedy included several flights of A-6 Intruders on exercises south of Crete, two pairs of F-14 Tomcats from VF-14 and VF-32 conducting combat air patrols, and an E-2 Hawkeye from VAW-126 providing airborne early warning and control.

The easternmost combat air patrol station was provided by the two F-14s from VF-32 with aircraft call signs Gypsy 207 (crewed by Commander Joseph Bernard Connelly and Commander Leo F. Enwright in Bureau Number 159610) and Gypsy 202 (crewed by Lieutenant Herman C. Cook III and Lieutenant Commander Steven Patrick Collins in Bureau Number 159437). Although the Kennedy battle group was not operating within the contentious Gulf of Sidra and was 600 miles (970 km) away from Rabta, the battle group commander believed Libyan concerns over a U.S. attack increased the likelihood of a confrontation. He gave the American air crews a special briefing emphasizing their rules of engagement.

At 11:55 local time, the airborne E-2 detected two Libyan MiG-23 Floggers taking off from Bomba (Al Bumbah) airfield near Tobruk, and observed them heading north toward the battle group. The two F-14s from VF-32 were directed to intercept the MiG-23s, while the F-14s from VF-14 covered the A-6s as they departed to the north. Using their onboard radars, the intercepting F-14s began tracking the MiG-23s when the Libyan aircraft were 72 nautical miles (133 km) away, at an altitude of 8,000 feet (2,400 m) and traveling at 420 knots (780 km/h; 480 mph). Unlike some previous aerial encounters in which Libyan pilots were instructed to turn back after detecting an F-14's radar signal sweep their aircraft, the MiG-23s continued to close on the American fighters with a head-on approach.

As both pairs of aircraft converged, the E-2 and other U.S. eavesdropping assets in the area monitored radio communications between the Libyan aircraft and their ground controllers. The Americans listened to the MiG-23s receiving guidance to intercept the F-14s from ground controllers at a radar station in Bomba. This radar station was one of several activated along the Libyan coast to support the MiG-23s.

Gun camera video and audio from the two American F-14s

At 11:58, the F-14s made a left turn, away from the MiG-23s, to initiate a standard intercept. Seven seconds later, the MiG-23s turned back into the American fighters for another head-on approach and were descending in altitude. At this point, the F-14 aircrews began employing tactics to reduce the effectiveness of the MiG-23s' radars and the 12-mile-range (19 km) AA-7 Apex missiles they were potentially carrying. The American aircraft started descending from 20,000 to 3,000 feet (6,100 to 910 m) to fly lower than the Libyan fighters. The drop in altitude was meant to prevent the MiG-23s from detecting the F-14s by using ocean clutter to confuse their onboard radars. The American pilots executed another left turn away from the Libyan aircraft during the descent. Moments after the F-14s created a 30-degree offset, the MiG-23s turned to place themselves back into a collision course and accelerated to 500 knots (930 km/h; 580 mph).

The air warfare commander on the Kennedy gave the American aircrews the authority to fire if they believed the MiG-23s were hostile. The F-14s turned away from the approaching MiG-23s two more times, and each time, the American aircrews saw the Libyan aircraft turn back toward them for a head-on approach. At 12:00:53, the Radar Intercept Officer (RIO) in the lead F-14, Commander Leo Enwright in Gypsy 207, ordered the arming of the AIM-7 Sparrow and AIM-9 Sidewinder missiles on the American fighters, after what he determined was the fifth time the Libyan aircraft turned back toward them.

The American aircrews armed their weapons when the opposing aircraft were less than 20 miles (32 km) away, the two groups closing in on each other at a rate of 1,000 knots (1,900 km/h; 1,200 mph). At a distance of about 14 nautical miles (26 km), the lead F-14 pilot, Commander Joseph Connelly, made a radio call to the carrier group's air warfare commander to see if there was any additional information in regard to the MiG-23s. There was no response to his call. At 12:01:20 and at a range of 12 nautical miles (22 km), Enwright fired an AIM-7, surprising Connelly, who did not expect to see a missile accelerate away from their aircraft. The missile failed to track toward its target. At a distance of about 10 nautical miles (19 kilometres), Enwright launched a second AIM-7, but it also failed to hit its target.

The MiG-23s continued to fly directly toward the American fighters at 550 knots (1,020 km/h; 630 mph). The F-14s executed a defensive split, where both aircraft made turns in opposite directions. Both Libyan fighters turned left to pursue the second F-14, Gypsy 202. Connelly prepared Gypsy 207 for a right turn to get behind the MiG-23s as they went after the other American fighter. With the MiG-23s pointed directly at them, the crew of Gypsy 202 fired a third AIM-7 from roughly five miles (8.0 km) away and downed one of the Libyan aircraft.

After executing a sharp right turn, Gypsy 207 gained a position in the rear quadrant of the remaining MiG-23. As the Libyan fighter was turning left and from a distance of one and a half miles (2.4 km), Connelly fired an AIM-9 missile, which downed its target. The second MiG-23 was hit by the AIM-9 at 12:02:36. The F-14s descended to an altitude of several hundred feet and returned at high speed to the carrier group. The Libyan pilots were both seen to successfully eject and parachute into the sea, but it is not known whether the Libyan Air Force was able to successfully recover them.

== Aftermath ==
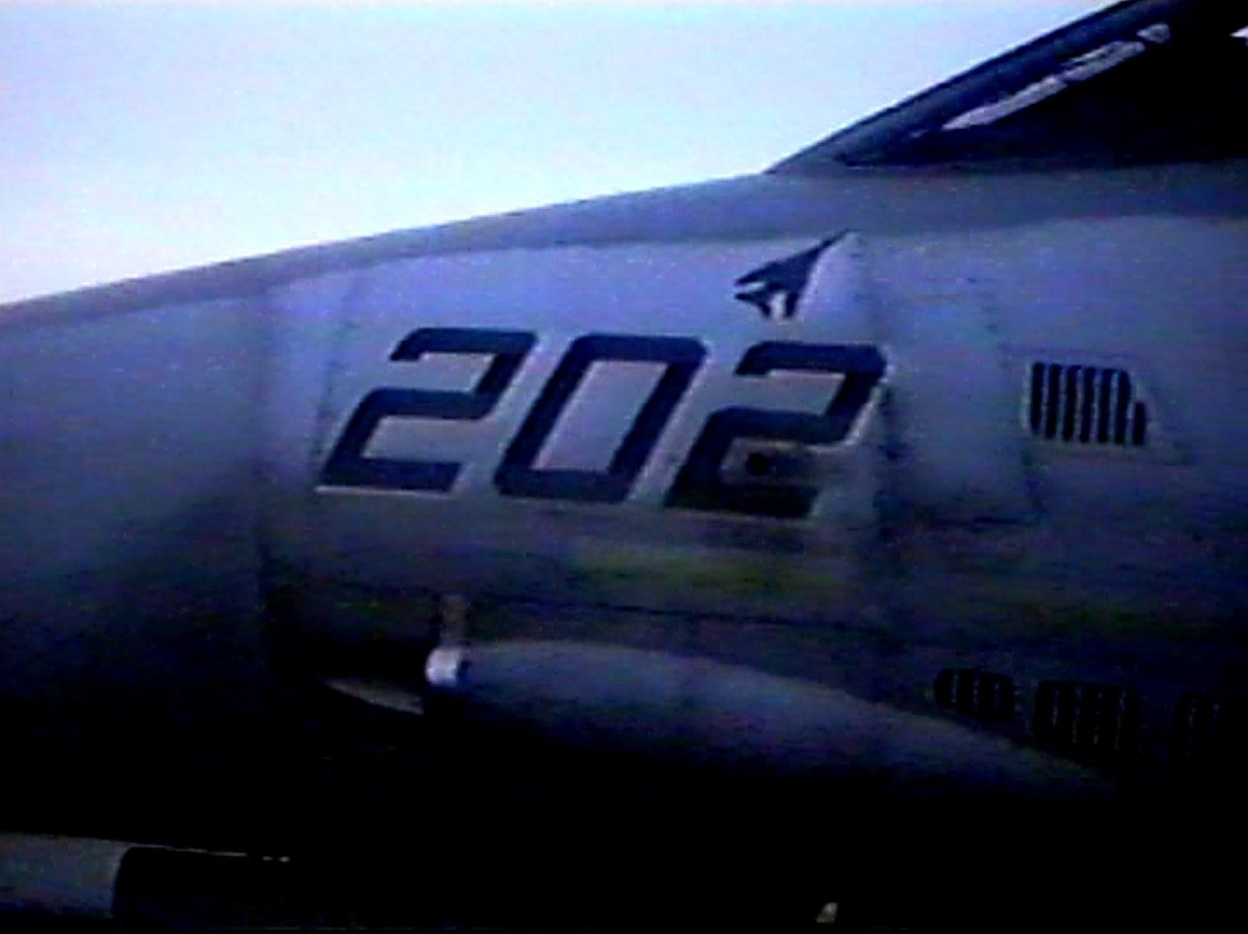
A MiG-23 silhouette was painted onto Gypsy 202 after the engagement; it was removed prior to returning from cruise.

The following day, Libya accused the U.S. of attacking two unarmed reconnaissance planes which were on a routine mission over international waters. Libyan leader Muammar Gaddafi called for a United Nations emergency session to take up the incident. The U.S. claimed the American aircrews acted in self-defense due to demonstrations of hostile intent by the Libyan aircraft.

Two days after the engagement, the Pentagon released photographs taken from the videotapes on the F-14s which, according to U.S. naval intelligence analysts, showed the lead MiG-23 armed with two AA-7 Apex missiles and two AA-8 Aphid missiles. The AA-7 can be either a semi-active radar-homing missile or an infrared-homing (heat-seeking) missile, and it can be fired at another aircraft from head-on. The imagery was used to prove the Libyan fighters were armed and helped support the U.S. position that the MiG-23s were hostile.

The intent for the Libyan aircraft on 4 January is not known for certain. Gaddafi could have believed the U.S. was preparing for an attack on the chemical facility in Rabta and ordered his military to see if the aircraft offshore were bombers bound for targets in Libya. The possible reasons for the MiG-23s' flight profile range from a deliberate attack against the battle group to a radio breakdown with ground controllers leading to the Libyan fighters merging with the F-14s.

Details released three months after the incident revealed that the MiG-23s never turned on their fire control radars, needed to guide their AA-7 missiles at maximum range. The turns by the Libyan pilots prior to the first missile launch by the F-14s were considered too slight to be hostile, according to U.S. House Armed Services Committee chairman Les Aspin. Despite these findings, Aspin said the self-defense claim by the U.S. was still justified due to the continued acceleration of the MiG-23s as they closed the distance with the F-14s and Libya's history of firing first.

== Legacy ==
=== F-14 Tomcat Bureau Numbers 159437, 159610 ===
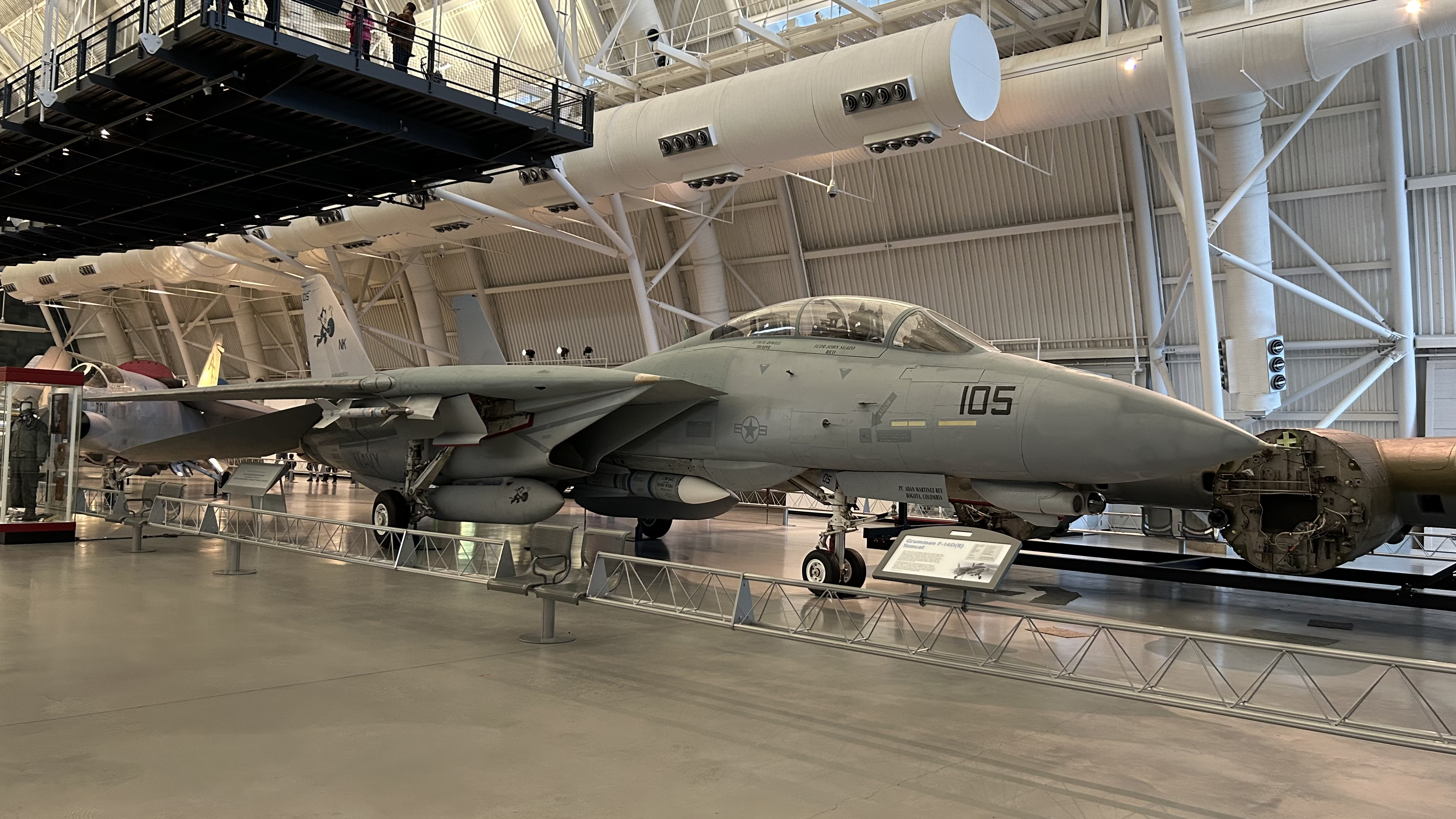
159610 on display at the Steven F. Udvar-Hazy Center in Chantilly, Virginia.

At the request of the National Air and Space Museum, the U.S. Navy donated Bureau Number (BuNo) 159610 to the Smithsonian Institution, where it was placed on display at the Steven F. Udvar-Hazy Center in Chantilly, Virginia. Although Tomcat BuNo 159610 downed the Libyan MiG-23 as a VF-32 F-14A model Tomcat, it returned from that deployment and was entered into the F-14D re-manufacture program, later serving in a precision strike role as a F-14D(R) with VF-31.

== See also ==
- Hainan Island incident – an incident involving aircraft between the U.S. and China
- Operation Odyssey Dawn
- Ouadi Doum air raid
- Pan Am Flight 103
