= Ghardabiya Airbase =

Libyan air base

Ghardabiya Airbase Sirte Airport
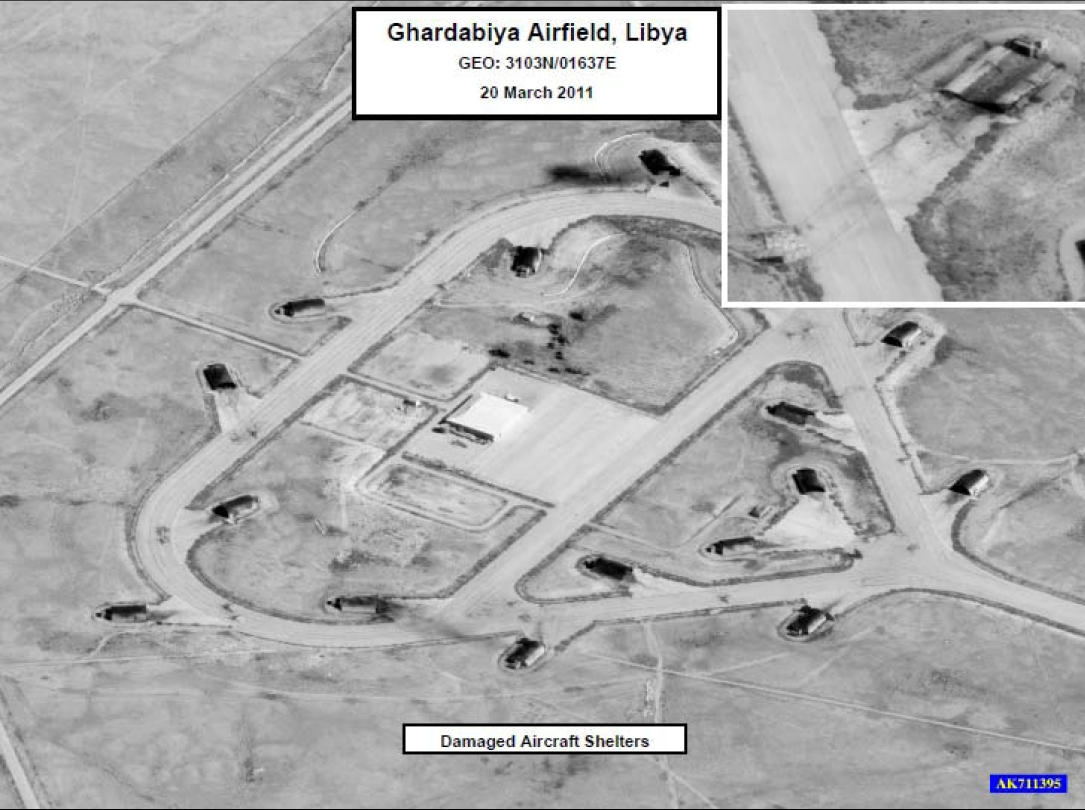
- United States Department of Defense reconnaissance photo of hangars at Ghardabiya
- IATA: SRX; ICAO: HLGD

Summary
- Airport type: Military/Public
- Serves: Sirte, Libya
- Elevation AMSL: 270 ft (82 m)
- Coordinates: 31°03′38″N 16°36′42″E

Map
- Location in Libya

Runways
Direction	Length		Surface
Direction	m	ft	Surface
31/13	3,600	11,811	Asphalt
18/36	3,600	11,811	Asphalt
- Source: GCM SkyVector Google Maps

Ghardabiya Airbase (IATA: SRX, ICAO: HLGD) is a dual-function airbase for the Libyan Air Force 15 kilometres (9.3 mi) south of the Mediterranean coastal city of Sirte. It also incorporates an airport for civilian use.

All runways have 305 metres (1,001 ft) displaced thresholds.

The Sirte non-directional beacon (Ident: SRT) is located 7.8 nautical miles (14.4 km) north of the airport, in the city. The Sirte VOR-DME (Ident: SRT) is located on the field.

== Military use ==
It is the home base of 1124th Bomber Squadron and 1st Fighter-Bomber Squadron which operate the Su-22 aircraft. The base also operates the Aero L-39 Albatros for counterinsurgency missions.

During the first Gulf of Sidra Incident, two Libyan Su-22s took off from this airbase and attacked two U.S. Navy F-14 Tomcats.

== Civilian use ==
Due to the First Libyan Civil War of 2011, all flights were suspended; however, since the end of the conflict, Libyan Airlines has resumed service. It is unknown if Air Libya has resumed services as well.

Airlines	Destinations
Libyan Airlines	Tripoli–Mitiga

== First Libyan Civil War (2011) ==
It was targeted by United States Air Force B-2 Spirit stealth bombers equipped with precision-guided munitions (PGMs) during the First Libyan Civil War on 20 and 21 March 2011. The United States Navy also participated in the attack to deny the Libyan Air Force operational capability with the use of Tomahawk cruise missiles.

== Second Libyan Civil War (2014–2020) ==
In May 2015, during the Second Libyan Civil War, ISIL militants took control of the airport only weeks after seizing full control of nearby Sirte. On 4 June 2016, Pro-Libyan government fighters stated that they had captured the airbase from ISIL.

In January 2020, Libyan forces loyal to the eastern-based commander Khalifa Haftar said they had taken control of the strategic coastal city of Sirte, including al-Ghardabiya airbase.

== See also ==
- Transport in Libya
- List of airports in Libya
