= List of current state leaders by date of assumption of office =

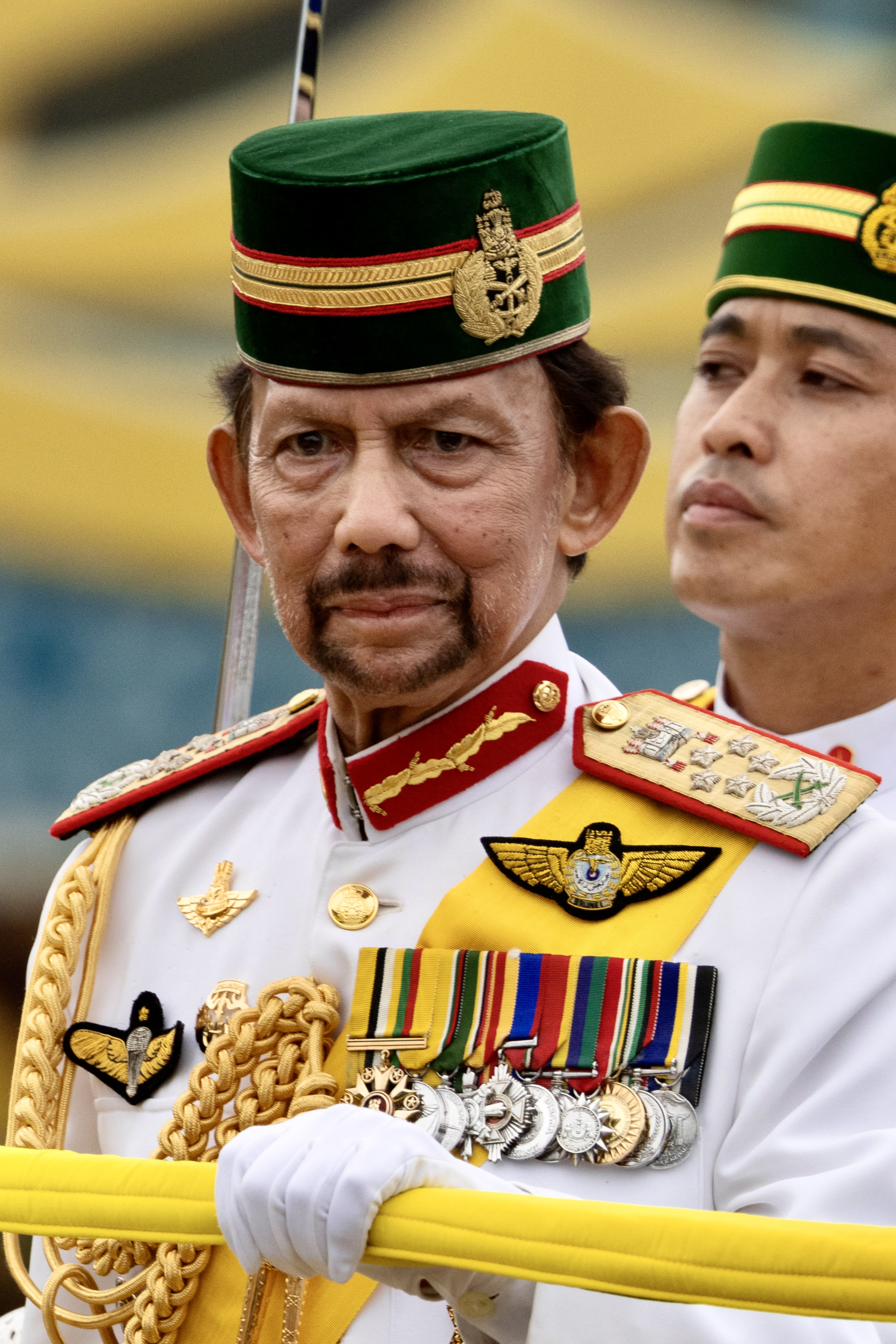
The longest-serving current leader, Hassanal Bolkiah, Sultan of Brunei, has ruled since 1967.

This is a list of current state leaders ordered by their continuous tenure in a position of national leadership. For countries in which the head of state and head of government are separate, both offices are listed. For leaders who held the same office prior to their state's independence, the start of their tenure is used, not independence. For a list of heads of state taking dates of independence into account, see List of heads of state by diplomatic precedence.

Acting presidents are included in this list, but if a leader has non-consecutive terms, only the current period of service is listed.

States where head of state differs from head of government are mainly parliamentary systems. Often a leader holds both positions in presidential systems or dictatorships. Some states have semi-presidential systems where the head of government role is fulfilled by both the listed head of government and the head of state.

== List of state leaders by date of assuming office ==
=== Prior to 2000 ===
Assumed office	Leader	State	Office
5 October 1967 (Note: Brunei was a British protectorate until 1 January 1984.)	Hassanal Bolkiah	Brunei	Sultan: 5 October 1967 – present; Prime Minister: 1 January 1984 – present
15 September 1973	Carl XVI Gustaf	Sweden	King
30 June 1975	Paul Biya	Cameroon	Prime Minister: 30 June 1975 – 6 November 1982; President: 6 November 1982 – present
3 August 1979	Teodoro Obiang Nguema Mbasogo	Equatorial Guinea	Chairman of the Supreme Military Council: 25 August 1979 – 12 October 1982; President: 12 October 1982 – present
10 August 1983	Ntfombi	Eswatini (Note: The country was called the Kingdom of Swaziland until 19 April 2018.)	Queen Regent: 10 August 1983 – 25 April 1986; Queen Mother: 25 April 1986 – present
26 August 1984	Hans-Adam II	Liechtenstein	Prince-Regent: 26 August 1984 – 13 November 1989; Prince: 13 November 1989 – present (Note: Alois has been Prince-Regent for his father, Hans-Adam II since 15 August 2004.)
29 January 1986	Yoweri Museveni	Uganda	President (Note: Yoweri Museveni was the de facto head of state of Uganda as Commander of the National Resistance Army from 26 – 29 January 1986.)
25 April 1986	Mswati III	Eswatini	King
27 April 1991 (Note: The country gained independence from Ethiopia on 24 May 1993.)	Isaias Afwerki	Eritrea	Secretary-General of the Provisional Government: 27 April 1991 – 24 May 1993; President: 24 May 1993 – present; Chairman of the People's Front for Democracy and Justice: 16 February 1994 – present
19 November 1992	Emomali Rahmon	Tajikistan	Acting Chairman of the Supreme Council: 19 November 1992 – 27 November 1992; Chairman of the Supreme Council: 27 November 1992 – 16 November 1994; President: 16 November 1994 – present
20 July 1994	Alexander Lukashenko	Belarus	President: 20 July 1994 – present (Note: Alexander Lukashenko's presidency has been disputed since 23 September 2020.); Chairman of the People's Assembly: 24 April 2024 – present
7 February 1996	Letsie III	Lesotho	King (Note: Letsie III was previously King of Lesotho from 12 November 1990 – 25 January 1995.)
25 October 1997	Denis Sassou Nguesso	Republic of the Congo	President (Note: Denis Sassou Nguesso was previously President of the People's Republic of the Congo / Republic of the Congo from 8 February 1979 – 31 August 1992. Sassou Nguesso was the de facto head of state of the Republic of the Congo as a militia leader from 15 October 1997 – 25 October 1997.)
25 January 1999	Abdullah II	Jordan	Prince-Regent: 25 January 1999 – 7 February 1999; King: 7 February 1999 – present
6 March 1999	Hamad bin Isa Al Khalifa	Bahrain (Note: The country was called the State of Bahrain before 14 February 2002.)	Emir: 6 March 1999 – 14 February 2002; King: 14 February 2002 – present
8 May 1999	Ismaïl Omar Guelleh	Djibouti	President
23 July 1999	Mohammed VI	Morocco	King
9 August 1999	Vladimir Putin	Russia	Acting Prime Minister: 9 August 1999 – 16 August 1999; Prime Minister: 16 August 1999 – 7 May 2000; 8 May 2008 – 7 May 2012; Acting President: 31 December 1999 – 7 May 2000; President: 7 May 2000 – 7 May 2008; 7 May 2012 – present

=== 2000–2009 ===
Assumed office	Leader	State	Office
24 March 2000	Paul Kagame	Rwanda	Acting President: 24 March 2000 – 22 April 2000; President: 22 April 2000 – present
14 March 2003	Recep Tayyip Erdoğan	Turkey	Prime Minister: 14 March 2003 – 28 August 2014; President: 28 August 2014 – present
4 August 2003	Ilham Aliyev	Azerbaijan	Prime Minister: 4 August 2003 – 4 November 2003 (Note: Artur Rasizade was Acting Prime Minister of Azerbaijan from 6 August 2003 – 4 November 2003.); President: 31 October 2003 – present
12 December 2003	Shavkat Mirziyoyev	Uzbekistan	Prime Minister: 12 December 2003 – 14 December 2016; Acting President: 8 September 2016 – 14 December 2016; President: 14 December 2016 – present
8 January 2004	Roosevelt Skerrit	Dominica	Prime Minister
15 August 2004	Alois	Liechtenstein	Prince-Regent
14 October 2004	Norodom Sihamoni	Cambodia	King
15 January 2005	Mahmoud Abbas	Palestine	President (Note: Mahmoud Abbas was Prime Minister of the Palestinian National Authority from 19 March 2003 – 6 September 2003.)
31 March 2005	Albert II	Monaco	Prince-Regent: 31 March 2005 – 6 April 2005; Prince: 6 April 2005 – present
4 May 2005	Faure Gnassingbé	Togo	President: 4 May 2005 – 3 May 2025 (Note: Faure Gnassingbé was previously President of Togo from 5 February 2005 – 25 February 2005.); Prime Minister: 3 May 2025 – present
30 July 2005 (Note: The country gained independence from Sudan on 9 July 2011.)	Salva Kiir	South Sudan (Note: It was the Southern Sudan Autonomous Region until 9 July 2011.)	President of the Regional Government: 30 July 2005 – 9 July 2011; President: 9 July 2011 – present
11 February 2006	Mohammed bin Rashid Al Maktoum	United Arab Emirates	Prime Minister
9 December 2006	Jigme Khesar Namgyel Wangchuck	Bhutan	King
10 January 2007	Daniel Ortega	Nicaragua	President: 10 January 2007 – 18 February 2025 (Note: Daniel Ortega was a member (and during 4 March 1981 – 10 January 1985 the Coordinator) of the Junta of National Reconstruction of Nicaragua 18 July 1979 – 10 January 1985; he was President of Nicaragua from 10 January 1985 – 25 April 1990.); Co-President: 18 February 2025 – present
26 February 2009	Patrick Allen	Jamaica	Governor-General (Note: The Governors-General of each Commonwealth realm outside of the United Kingdom represent Charles III.)

=== 2010–2014 ===
Assumed office	Leader	State	Office
4 December 2010	Alassane Ouattara	Ivory Coast	President (Note: Alassane Ouattara was Prime Minister of Ivory Coast from 7 November 1990 – 9 December 1993.)
17 December 2011	Kim Jong Un	North Korea	Supreme Leader (Note: The late Kim Il Sung has been designated "Eternal President of North Korea" and the post of President has not been filled since his death on 8 July 1994, making Kim Il-sung in his de jure capacity the only deceased person considered a current head of state in the world. The term Supreme Leader is used as a description, for the sake of brevity, rather than being an official title of a single office. The actual offices held by Kim Jong-un are: General Secretary of the Workers' Party of Korea, Chairman of the Central Military Commission of the Workers' Party of Korea, President of the State Affairs Commission of the DPRK, and Commander-in-Chief of the Armed Forces of the DPRK. The office of President of the State Affairs Commission was formalized as head of state by a constitutional amendment proclaimed on 11 April 2019.)
18 March 2012	Tupou VI	Tonga	King (Note: Tupou VI (then known as Prince ʻUlukālala Lavaka Ata) was Prime Minister of Tonga from 3 January 2000 – 11 February 2006.)
15 November 2012	Xi Jinping	China	Paramount leader as General Secretary of the Communist Party: 15 November 2012 – present; President: 14 March 2013 – present
5 March 2013	Nicolás Maduro	Venezuela	Acting President: 5 March 2013 – 19 April 2013; President: 19 April 2013 – 3 January 2026 (Note: The office of President of Venezuela has been in dispute between Nicolás Maduro and Edmundo González of the Unitary Platform, since 10 January 2025. The office of President of Venezuela has been in dispute between Delcy Rodríguez and Edmundo González since 3 January 2026.)
5 March 2013	Nicolás Maduro	Venezuela	De jure President: 3 January 2026 – present
1 April 2013	Abdoulkader Kamil Mohamed	Djibouti	Prime Minister
30 April 2013	Willem-Alexander	Netherlands	King
7 May 2013	Cécile La Grenade	Grenada	Governor-General
25 June 2013	Tamim bin Hamad Al Thani	Qatar	Emir
21 July 2013	Philippe	Belgium	King
15 September 2013	Edi Rama	Albania	Prime Minister
23 November 2013	Kokhir Rasulzoda	Tajikistan	Prime Minister
25 January 2014	Mohamed bin Zayed Al Nahyan	United Arab Emirates	De facto President: 25 January 2014 – 13 May 2022 (Note: Mohamed bin Zayed was regent for his brother, Khalifa bin Zayed Al Nahyan from 25 January 2014 – 13 May 2022.); President: 14 May 2022 – present
26 May 2014	Narendra Modi	India	Prime Minister
8 June 2014	Abdel Fattah el-Sisi	Egypt	President
13 June 2014	Gaston Browne	Antigua and Barbuda	Prime Minister
19 June 2014	Felipe VI	Spain	King
14 August 2014	Rodney Williams	Antigua and Barbuda	Governor-General

=== 2015–2017 ===
Assumed office	Leader	State	Office
23 January 2015	Salman	Saudi Arabia	King: 23 January 2015 – present; Prime Minister: 23 January 2015 – 27 September 2022
3 February 2015	Sergio Mattarella	Italy	President
6 February 2015 (Note: Leader of Ansar Allah as an insurgency since 2004, until the successful takeover in 2015)	Abdul-Malik al-Houthi	Yemen (Supreme Political Council) (Note: The Supreme Political Council of Houthi-controlled Yemen was formed on 28 July 2016, largely taking the powers of the Supreme Revolutionary Committee until 15 August 2016.)	Leader of Ansar Allah
1 January 2016	Guy Parmelin	Switzerland	Federal Councilor: 1 January 2016 – present; President: 1 January 2021 – 31 December 2021; 1 January 2026 – present (Note: The Swiss Federal Council is a collective seven-member body that serves as head of state and government. The President of Switzerland serves solely in a primus inter pares capacity for one year.)
3 March 2016	Andrew Holness	Jamaica	Prime Minister (Note: Andrew Holness was Prime Minister of Jamaica from 23 October 2011 – 5 January 2012.)
11 March 2016	Taneti Maamau	Kiribati	President
30 March 2016	Faustin-Archange Touadéra	Central African Republic	President (Note: Faustin Touadéra was Prime Minister of the Central African Republic from 22 January 2008 – 17 January 2013.)
20 April 2016	Thongloun Sisoulith	Laos	Prime Minister: 20 April 2016 – 22 March 2021; General Secretary of the People's Revolutionary Party: 15 January 2021 – present; President: 22 March 2021 – present
26 May 2016	Azali Assoumani	Comoros	President (Note: Azali Assoumani was Chief of Staff of the National Development Army (de facto leader of the Comoros) from 30 April 1999 – 6 May 1999, Head of State of the Comoros from 6 May 1999 – 21 January 2002, then the elected President from 6 May 2002 – 26 May 2006.)
12 July 2016	Brahim Ghali	Sahrawi Republic	General Secretary of the Polisario Front and President
13 October 2016	Vajiralongkorn	Thailand	King (Note: Prem Tinsulanonda was Regent of Thailand from 13 October 2016 – 1 December 2016.)
19 October 2016	Andrej Plenković	Croatia	Prime Minister
14 December 2016	Abdulla Aripov	Uzbekistan	Prime Minister
16 December 2016	Vadim Krasnoselsky	Transnistria	President
19 January 2017	Adama Barrow	The Gambia	President
26 January 2017	Alexander Van der Bellen	Austria	President
28 February 2017	Bob Dadae	Papua New Guinea	Governor-General
19 March 2017	Frank-Walter Steinmeier	Germany	President
14 May 2017	Emmanuel Macron	Andorra	French Co-Prince (Note: The Representatives of Andorra each represent their respective Co-Prince. Eduard Ibáñez represents Josep-Lluís Serrano Pentinat, while Georges-François Leclerc represents Emmanuel Macron.)
14 May 2017	Emmanuel Macron	France	President
21 July 2017	Tuimalealiʻifano Vaʻaletoʻa Sualauvi II	Samoa	O le Ao o le Malo (Note: Tuimalealiʻifano Vaʻaletoʻa Sualauvi II was Acting O le Ao o le Malo from 11 May 2007 – 20 June 2007.)
26 September 2017	João Lourenço	Angola	President
1 October 2017 (Note: Commander-in-Chief of Hay'at Tahrir al-Sham from 2017 until the successful major offensive in 2024, then de facto Leader of Syria until 29 January 2025.)	Ahmed al-Sharaa	Syria	Leader of the Syrian Salvation Government: 1 October 2017 – 8 December 2024; De facto Leader of Syria: 8 December 2024 – 29 January 2025; President: 29 January 2025 – present (Note: Leader of the Syrian transitional government under the 2025 constitutional declaration.)
1 November 2017	Ignazio Cassis	Switzerland	Federal Councilor: 1 November 2017 – present; President: 1 January 2022 – 31 December 2022
24 November 2017	Emmerson Mnangagwa	Zimbabwe	President

=== 2018–2019 ===
Assumed office	Leader	State	Office
14 February 2018	Cyril Ramaphosa	South Africa	Acting President: 14 February 2018 – 15 February 2018; President: 15 February 2018 – present
2 April 2018	Abiy Ahmed	Ethiopia	Prime Minister
4 April 2018	Julius Maada Bio	Sierra Leone	President (Note: Julius Maada Bio was Head of State of Sierra Leone (as leader of the Supreme Council of State) from 16 January 1996 – 29 March 1996.)
19 April 2018	Miguel Díaz-Canel	Cuba	President: 19 April 2018 – present (Note: The office of Head of State of Cuba was styled as President of the Council of State from 2 December 1976 – 10 October 2019, then as President of the Republic 10 October 2019 – present.); President of the Council of Ministers: 19 April 2018 – 21 December 2019 (Note: The office of Head of Government of Cuba was styled as President of the Council of Ministers from 2 December 1976 – 21 December 2019, then as Prime Minister from 21 December 2019 – present.); First Secretary of the Communist Party: 19 April 2021 – present
25 April 2018	Mahdi al-Mashat	Yemen (Supreme Political Council)	Chairman of the Supreme Political Council
8 May 2018	Nikol Pashinyan	Armenia	Prime Minister
25 May 2018	Mia Mottley	Barbados	Prime Minister
2 June 2018	Pedro Sánchez	Spain	Prime Minister
7 June 2018	Mostafa Madbouly	Egypt	Acting Prime Minister: 7 June 2018 – 14 June 2018; Prime Minister: 14 June 2018 – present (Note: Mostafa Madbouly was Acting Prime Minister of Egypt from 23 November 2017 – 27 January 2018.)
16 December 2018	Salomé Zourabichvili	Georgia	President: 16 December 2018 – 29 December 2024
16 December 2018	Salomé Zourabichvili	Georgia (opposition)	President: 29 December 2024 – present
1 January 2019	Karin Keller-Sutter	Switzerland	Federal Councilor: 1 January 2019 – present; President: 1 January 2025 – 31 December 2025
4 January 2019	Joseph Ngute	Cameroon	Prime Minister
24 January 2019	Félix Tshisekedi	Democratic Republic of the Congo	President
20 March 2019	Kassym-Jomart Tokayev	Kazakhstan	President: 20 March 2019 – present; Chairman of the Security Council: 5 January 2022 – present (Note: Kassym-Jomart Tokayev was Acting Prime Minister of Kazakhstan from 1 October 1999 – 12 October 1999, then Prime Minister of Kazakhstan from 12 October 1999 – 28 January 2002.)
12 April 2019	Abdel Fattah al-Burhan	Sudan	Chairman of the Transitional Military Council: 12 April 2019 – 21 August 2019; Chairman of the Sovereignty Council: 21 August 2019 – 25 October 2021; De facto Head of State: 25 October 2021 – 11 November 2021; Chairman of the Transitional Sovereignty Council: 11 November 2021 – present
1 May 2019	Naruhito	Japan	Emperor
16 May 2019	Xavier Espot Zamora	Andorra	Prime Minister
20 May 2019	Volodymyr Zelenskyy	Ukraine	President
30 May 2019	James Marape	Papua New Guinea	Prime Minister
1 June 2019	Nayib Bukele	El Salvador	President
27 June 2019	Mette Frederiksen	Denmark	Prime Minister
12 July 2019	Gitanas Nausėda	Lithuania	President
1 August 2019	Mohamed Ould Ghazouani	Mauritania	President
8 October 2019	Ali Asadov	Azerbaijan	Prime Minister
23 October 2019	Kais Saied	Tunisia	President
19 December 2019	Abdelmadjid Tebboune	Algeria	President (Note: Abdelmadjid Tebboune was Prime Minister of Algeria from 25 May 2017 – 15 August 2017.)
21 December 2019	Manuel Marrero Cruz	Cuba	Prime Minister

=== 2020–2021 ===
Assumed office	Leader	State	Office
8 January 2020	Luca Beccari	San Marino	Secretary for Foreign and Political Affairs (Note: The Secretary for Foreign Affairs is the de facto head of government of San Marino.) (Note: Luca Beccari was a Captain Regent of San Marino from 1 April 2014 – 1 October 2014.)
11 January 2020	Haitham bin Tariq	Oman	Sultan and Prime Minister
13 January 2020	Robert Abela	Malta	Prime Minister
13 January 2020	Bouchraya Hammoudi Bayoun	Sahrawi Republic	Prime Minister (Note: Bouchraya Hammoudi Bayoun was Prime Minister of the Sahrawi Republic from 19 September 1993 – 8 September 1995 and 10 February 1999 – 29 October 2003.)
16 January 2020	Mikhail Mishustin	Russia	Prime Minister (Note: Andrey Belousov was acting as Prime Minister for Mikhail Mishustin from 30 April 2020 – 19 May 2020.)
18 February 2020	Zoran Milanović	Croatia	President (Note: Zoran Milanović was Prime Minister of Croatia from 23 December 2011 – 22 January 2016.)
18 June 2020	Évariste Ndayishimiye	Burundi	President
2 August 2020	Irfaan Ali	Guyana	President
2 August 2020	Mark Phillips	Guyana	Prime Minister
14 August 2020	Sviatlana Tsikhanouskaya	Belarus (opposition)	President of the Coordination Council: 14 August 2020 – present; Head of the United Transitional Cabinet: 9 August 2022 – present
16 August 2020	Luis Abinader	Dominican Republic	President
11 November 2020	Salman bin Hamad Al Khalifa	Bahrain	Prime Minister
12 November 2020	Johnny Briceño	Belize	Prime Minister
24 December 2020	Maia Sandu	Moldova	President (Note: Maia Sandu was Prime Minister of Moldova from 8 June 2019 – 14 November 2019.)
21 January 2021	Surangel Whipps Jr.	Palau	President
28 January 2021	Sadyr Japarov	Kyrgyzstan	President (Note: Sadyr Japarov was Acting Prime Minister of Kyrgyzstan from 6 October 2020 – 10 October 2020, Prime Minister of Kyrgyzstan from 10 October 2020 – 21 January 2021, and Acting President of Kyrgyzstan from 15 October 2020 – 14 November 2020. Japarov took a leave of absence from the office of Prime Minister from 14 November 2020 – 11 January 2021 to compete in the 2021 Kyrgyz presidential election, and Artem Novikov acted for Japarov.)
2 February 2021	Min Aung Hlaing	Myanmar	Chairman of the State Administration Council: 2 February 2021 – 31 July 2025; Prime Minister: 1 August 2021 – 31 July 2025; Acting President: 22 July 2024 – 10 April 2026 (Note: Min Aung Hlaing was Acting President of Myanmar due to his chairmanship of the National Defence and Security Council.); Chairman of the State Security and Peace Commission: 31 July 2025 – 10 April 2026; President: 10 April 2026 – present
9 March 2021	Mahn Winn Khaing Thann	Myanmar (opposition)	Acting President: 9 March 2021 – 16 April 2021; Prime Minister: 16 April 2021 – present
15 March 2021	Mohamed al-Menfi	Libya	Chairman of the Presidential Council (Note: As part of a ceasefire agreement, the office of Head of State of Libya consists of a Tripartite presidential council.)
15 March 2021	Abdul Hamid Dbeibeh	Libya	Prime Minister (Note: The office of Prime Minister of Libya has been in dispute between Abdul Hamid Dbeibeh and Fathi Bashagha/Osama Hamada, the Interim Prime Minister of the Government of National Stability supported by the Tobruk-based House of Representatives, since 3 March 2022.)
19 March 2021	Samia Suluhu Hassan	Tanzania	President
22 March 2021	Albin Kurti	Kosovo	Prime Minister (Note: Albin Kurti was Prime Minister of Kosovo from 3 February 2020 – 3 June 2020.)
16 April 2021	Duwa Lashi La	Myanmar (opposition)	Acting President
20 April 2021	Mahamat Déby	Chad	President of the Transitional Military Council: 20 April 2021 – 10 October 2022; Transitional President: 10 October 2022 – 23 May 2024; President: 23 May 2024 – present
18 May 2021	Anatole Collinet Makosso	Republic of the Congo	Prime Minister
24 May 2021	Assimi Goïta	Mali	De facto President: 24 May 2021 – 28 May 2021; Interim President: 28 May 2021 – 8 July 2025; President: 8 July 2025 – present (Note: Assimi Goïta was Head of State of Mali (as Chairman of the National Committee for the Salvation of the People of Mali) from 19 August 2020 – 27 August 2020 and Acting Head of State of Mali from 27 August 2020 – 25 September 2020.)
27 May 2021	Froyla Tzalam	Belize	Governor-General
21 June 2021	Robinah Nabbanja	Uganda	Prime Minister
7 July 2021	Isaac Herzog	Israel	President
28 July 2021	Philip J. Pierre	Saint Lucia	Prime Minister
15 August 2021	Hibatullah Akhundzada	Afghanistan	Supreme Leader
24 August 2021	Hakainde Hichilema	Zambia	President
5 September 2021	Mamady Doumbouya	Guinea	Chairman of the National Committee of Reconciliation and Development: 5 September 2021 – 17 January 2026; Interim President: 1 October 2021 – 17 January 2026; President: 17 January 2026 – present
7 September 2021	Hasan Akhund	Afghanistan	Acting Prime Minister: 7 September 2021 – 23 August 2025; Prime Minister: 23 August 2025 – present
17 September 2021	Philip Davis	The Bahamas	Prime Minister
2 October 2021	Carlos Vila Nova	São Tomé and Príncipe	President
14 October 2021	Jonas Gahr Støre	Norway	Prime Minister
21 October 2021	Cindy Kiro	New Zealand	Governor-General
9 November 2021	José Maria Neves	Cape Verde	President (Note: Janira Hopffer Almada served as Acting President from 15 September 2026 – 15 November 2026.)

=== 2022 ===
Assumed office	Leader	State	Office
9 February	Félix Moloua	Central African Republic	Prime Minister
13 March	Vahagn Khachaturyan	Armenia	President
19 March	Serdar Berdimuhamedow	Turkmenistan	President
7 April	Rashad al-Alimi	Yemen	Chairman of the Presidential Leadership Council (Note: The office of Head of State of Yemen has been in dispute between Rashad Al-Alimi and the Leader of the Supreme Political Council, Mahdi al-Mashat, since 7 April 2022.)
12 May	Ünal Üstel	Northern Cyprus	Prime Minister
20 May	José Ramos-Horta	Timor-Leste	President (Note: José Ramos-Horta was Acting Prime Minister of Timor-Leste from 26 June 2006 – 10 July 2006, Prime Minister of Timor-Leste from 10 July 2006 – 19 May 2007 and President of Timor-Leste from 20 May 2007 – 11 February 2008 and 17 April 2008 – 20 May 2012.)
23 May	Anthony Albanese	Australia	Prime Minister
23 May	Hassan Sheikh Mohamud	Somalia	President (Note: Hassan Sheikh Mohamud was President of Somalia from 16 September 2012 – 16 February 2017) (Note: The presidency has been disputed since 15 May 2026, with Mohamud asserting that the constitutional amendments passed on 30 March 2024 means that he continues to be the legitimate president until 15 May 2027. The opposition dispute the constitutional amendments as being invalid, stating that the constitutional term of Mohamud expired on 15 May 2026 in accordance with the provisional constitution of Somalia.)
30 May	Aleksandr Rozenberg	Transnistria	Prime Minister
24 June	Dickon Mitchell	Grenada	Prime Minister
25 June	Hamza Abdi Barre	Somalia	Prime Minister
30 June	Bongbong Marcos	Philippines	President
23 July	Nikenike Vurobaravu	Vanuatu	President
24 July	Bajram Begaj	Albania	President
25 July	Droupadi Murmu	India	President
6 August	Terrance Drew	Saint Kitts and Nevis	Prime Minister
8 September	Charles III	Antigua and Barbuda	King
8 September	Charles III	Australia	King
8 September	Charles III	The Bahamas	King
8 September	Charles III	Belize	King
8 September	Charles III	Canada	King
8 September	Charles III	Grenada	King
8 September	Charles III	Jamaica	King
8 September	Charles III	New Zealand	King
8 September	Charles III	Papua New Guinea	King
8 September	Charles III	Saint Kitts and Nevis	King
8 September	Charles III	Saint Lucia	King
8 September	Charles III	Saint Vincent and the Grenadines	King
8 September	Charles III	Solomon Islands	King
8 September	Charles III	Tuvalu	King
8 September	Charles III	United Kingdom	King
13 September	William Ruto	Kenya	President
27 September	Mohammed bin Salman	Saudi Arabia	Prime Minister
30 September	Ibrahim Traoré	Burkina Faso	President of the Patriotic Movement for Safeguard and Restoration: 30 September 2022 – present; Interim President: 6 October 2022 – present
18 October	Ulf Kristersson	Sweden	Prime Minister
22 October	Giorgia Meloni	Italy	Prime Minister
27 October	Musalia Mudavadi	Kenya	Prime Cabinet Secretary
28 October	Sam Matekane	Lesotho	Prime Minister
16 November	Denis Bećirović	Bosnia and Herzegovina	Presidency Member: 16 November 2022 – present; Chairman of the Presidency: 16 March 2024 – 16 November 2024; 16 March 2026 – 16 November 2026 (Note: In Bosnia and Herzegovina, the Presidency is a Tripartite council, with the Chairman of the Presidency rotating every eight months.)
16 November	Željka Cvijanović	Bosnia and Herzegovina	Presidency Member: 16 November 2022 – present; Chairwoman of the Presidency: 16 November 2022 – 16 July 2023; 16 November 2024 – 16 July 2025 and 16 November 2026 – present
24 November	Anwar Ibrahim	Malaysia	Prime Minister
22 December	Nataša Pirc Musar	Slovenia	President
24 December	Sitiveni Rabuka	Fiji	Prime Minister (Note: Sitiveni Rabuka was Acting Head of State of Fiji (as President of the Interim Military Government) from 14 May 1987 – 5 December 1987, then Prime Minister of Fiji from 2 June 1992 – 19 May 1999.)
29 December	Benjamin Netanyahu	Israel	Prime Minister (Note: Benjamin Netanyahu was Prime Minister of Israel from 18 June 1996 – 6 July 1999 and 31 March 2009 – 13 June 2021.)

=== 2023 ===
Assumed office	Leader	State	Office
1 January	Luiz Inácio Lula da Silva	Brazil	President (Note: Luiz Inácio Lula da Silva was President of Brazil from 1 January 2003 – 31 December 2010.)
1 January	Élisabeth Baume-Schneider	Switzerland	Federal Councilor
1 January	Albert Rösti	Switzerland	Federal Councilor
25 January	Borjana Krišto	Bosnia and Herzegovina	Chairwoman of the Council of Ministers
1 February	Marcella Liburd	Saint Kitts and Nevis	Governor-General
28 February	Nikos Christodoulides	Cyprus	President
7 March	Mohammed bin Abdulrahman bin Jassim Al Thani	Qatar	Prime Minister
9 March	Petr Pavel	Czech Republic	President
11 March	Li Qiang	China	Premier
13 March	Ram Chandra Poudel	Nepal	President
20 March	Christine Kangaloo	Trinidad and Tobago	President
11 May	Wesley Simina	Micronesia	President
16 May	Osama Hammad	Libya (Government of National Stability)	Acting Prime Minister
20 May	Jakov Milatović	Montenegro	President
29 May	Bola Tinubu	Nigeria	President
20 June	Petteri Orpo	Finland	Prime Minister
26 June	Kyriakos Mitsotakis	Greece	Prime Minister (Note: Kyriakos Mitsotakis was Prime Minister of Greece from 8 July 2019 – 25 May 2023.)
1 July	Xanana Gusmão	Timor-Leste	Prime Minister (Note: Xanana Gusmão was President of Timor-Leste from 20 May 2002 – 20 May 2007 and Prime Minister of Timor-Leste from 8 August 2007 – 16 February 2015.)
8 July	Edgars Rinkēvičs	Latvia	President
10 July	David Moinina Sengeh	Sierra Leone	Chief Minister
26 July	Abdourahamane Tiani	Niger	President of the National Council for the Safeguard of the Homeland: 26 July 2023 – present; Transitional President: 26 March 2025 – present
8 August	Ali Lamine Zeine	Niger	Acting Prime Minister
22 August	Hun Manet	Cambodia	Prime Minister
30 August	Brice Oligui Nguema	Gabon	Chairman of the Committee for the Transition and Restoration of Institutions: 30 August 2023 – 2 May 2025; Transitional President: 4 September 2023 – 3 May 2025; President: 3 May 2025 – present
1 September	Cynthia A. Pratt	The Bahamas	Governor-General (Note: Cynthia A. Pratt was Acting Prime Minister of the Bahamas from 4 May 2005 – 22 June 2005.)
14 September	Tharman Shanmugaratnam	Singapore	President
2 October	Sylvanie Burton	Dominica	President
17 October	Robert Beugré Mambé	Ivory Coast	Prime Minister
25 October	Robert Fico	Slovakia	Prime Minister (Note: Robert Fico was Prime Minister of Slovakia from 4 July 2006 – 8 July 2010 and 4 April 2012 – 22 March 2018.)
30 October	David Adeang	Nauru	President
31 October	Milojko Spajić	Montenegro	Prime Minister
3 November	Russell Dlamini	Eswatini	Prime Minister
17 November	Luc Frieden	Luxembourg	Prime Minister
17 November	Mohamed Muizzu	Maldives	President
23 November	Daniel Noboa	Ecuador	President
27 November	Christopher Luxon	New Zealand	Prime Minister
28 November	Eduard Ibáñez	Andorra	Personal Representative of the Episcopal Co-Prince
10 December	Javier Milei	Argentina	President
13 December	Donald Tusk	Poland	Prime Minister (Note: Donald Tusk was Prime Minister of Poland from 16 November 2007 – 22 September 2014.)
16 December	Mishal Al-Ahmad Al-Jaber Al-Sabah	Kuwait	Emir

=== 2024 ===
Assumed office	Leader	State	Office
1 January	Beat Jans	Switzerland	Federal Councilor
1 January	Viktor Rossi	Switzerland	Chancellor
3 January	Hilda Heine	Marshall Islands	President (Note: Hilda Heine was President of the Marshall Islands from 28 January 2016 – 13 January 2020.)
14 January	Frederik X	Denmark	King
15 January	Bernardo Arévalo	Guatemala	President
22 January	Joseph Boakai	Liberia	President
28 January	Tshering Tobgay	Bhutan	Prime Minister (Note: Tshering Tobgay was Prime Minister of Bhutan from 27 July 2013 – 9 August 2018.)
31 January	Ibrahim Iskandar	Malaysia	King
6 February	Oljas Bektenov	Kazakhstan	Prime Minister
8 February	Irakli Kobakhidze	Georgia	Prime Minister
26 February	Feleti Teo	Tuvalu	Prime Minister
27 February	Bah Oury	Guinea	Prime Minister
1 March	Alexander Stubb	Finland	President (Note: Alexander Stubb was Prime Minister of Finland from 24 June 2014 – 29 May 2015.)
4 March	Shehbaz Sharif	Pakistan	Prime Minister (Note: Shehbaz Sharif was Prime Minister of Pakistan from 11 April 2022 – 13 August 2023.)
10 March	Asif Ali Zardari	Pakistan	President (Note: Asif Ali Zardari was President of Pakistan from 9 September 2008 – 9 September 2013.)
14 March	Mohammad Mustafa	Palestine	Prime Minister
2 April	Luís Montenegro	Portugal	Prime Minister
2 April	Bassirou Diomaye Faye	Senegal	President
4 April	Myriam Spiteri Debono	Malta	President
12 May	Gordana Siljanovska-Davkova	North Macedonia	President
15 May	Ahmad Al-Abdullah Al-Sabah	Kuwait	Prime Minister
15 May	Lawrence Wong	Singapore	Prime Minister
20 May	Lai Ching-te	Taiwan	President (Note: Lai Ching-te was Premier of Taiwan from 8 September 2017 – 14 January 2019.)
20 May	Cho Jung-tai	Taiwan	Premier
22 May	Tô Lâm	Vietnam	President: 22 May 2024 – 21 October 2024; 7 April 2026 – present; Acting General Secretary of the Communist Party: 19 July 2024 – 3 August 2024; General Secretary of the Communist Party: 3 August 2024 – present
24 May	Allamaye Halina	Chad	Prime Minister
12 June	Judith Suminwa	Democratic Republic of the Congo	Prime Minister
15 June	Peter Pellegrini	Slovakia	President (Note: Peter Pellegrini was Prime Minister of Slovakia from 22 March 2018 – 21 March 2020.)
23 June	Hristijan Mickoski	North Macedonia	Prime Minister
1 July	Sam Mostyn	Australia	Governor-General
1 July	José Raúl Mulino	Panama	President
7 July	David Tiva Kapu	Solomon Islands	Governor-General
23 July	Kristen Michal	Estonia	Prime Minister
28 July	Masoud Pezeshkian	Iran	President: 28 July 2024 – present; Member of the Interim Leadership Council: 1 March 2026 – 8 March 2026
1 August	Halla Tómasdóttir	Iceland	President
5 August	Mokhtar Ould Djay	Mauritania	Prime Minister
17 August	Manuel Osa Nsue Nsua	Equatorial Guinea	Prime Minister
15 September	Jafar Hassan	Jordan	Prime Minister
23 September	Anura Kumara Dissanayake	Sri Lanka	President
24 September	Harini Amarasuriya	Sri Lanka	Prime Minister
1 October	Claudia Sheinbaum	Mexico	President
7 October	Taye Atske Selassie	Ethiopia	President
8 October	Guillaume V	Luxembourg	Regent: 8 October 2024 – 3 October 2025 (Note: Guillaume was Lieutenant-Representative (Regent) for his father, Henri from 8 October 2024 – 3 October 2025.); Grand Duke: 3 October 2025 – present
20 October	Prabowo Subianto	Indonesia	President
1 November	Duma Boko	Botswana	President
10 November	Alix Didier Fils-Aimé	Haiti	Acting Prime Minister: 10 November 2024 – present; Acting President: 7 February 2026 – present
12 November	Naiqama Lalabalavu	Fiji	President
13 November	Navin Ramgoolam	Mauritius	Prime Minister (Note: Navin Ramgoolam was Prime Minister of Mauritius from 27 December 1995 – 11 September 2000 and 5 July 2005 – 17 December 2014.)
19 November	Badra Gunba	Abkhazia	Acting President: 19 November 2024 – 2 April 2025; President: 2 April 2025 – present
21 November	Abdoulaye Maïga	Mali	Acting Prime Minister (Note: Abdoulaye Maïga was acting prime minister of Mali from 21 August 2022 – 5 December 2022.)
6 December	Dharam Gokhool	Mauritius	President
7 December	Jean Emmanuel Ouédraogo	Burkina Faso	Interim Prime Minister
12 December	Abdirahman Mohamed Abdullahi	Somaliland	President
16 December	Adylbek Kasymaliev	Kyrgyzstan	Acting Chairman of the Cabinet of Ministers: 16 December 2024 – 18 December 2024; Chairman of the Cabinet of Ministers: 18 December 2024 – present
21 December	Kristrún Frostadóttir	Iceland	Prime Minister
29 December	Mikheil Kavelashvili	Georgia	President (Note: The office of Head of State of Georgia has been disputed between Mikheil Kavelashvili and Salomé Zourabichvili, since 29 December 2024.)
29 December	Pak Thae-song	North Korea	Premier

=== 2025 ===
Assumed office	Leader	State	Office
7 January	John Mahama	Ghana	President (Note: John Mahama was President of Ghana from 24 July 2012 – 7 January 2017.)
9 January	Joseph Aoun	Lebanon	President
14 January	Américo Ramos	São Tomé and Príncipe	Prime Minister
15 January	Daniel Chapo	Mozambique	President
15 January	Maria Benvinda Levy	Mozambique	Prime Minister
20 January	Donald Trump	United States	President (Note: Donald Trump was President of the United States from 20 January 2017 – 20 January 2021.)
23 January	Micheál Martin	Ireland	Taoiseach (Note: Micheál Martin was Taoiseach from 27 June 2020 – 17 December 2022.)
3 February	Bart De Wever	Belgium	Prime Minister
8 February	Nawaf Salam	Lebanon	Prime Minister
11 February	Jotham Napat	Vanuatu	Prime Minister
18 February	Rosario Murillo	Nicaragua	Co-President
1 March	Yamandú Orsi	Uruguay	President
1 March	Raffaella Petrini	Vatican City	President of the Governorate
3 March	Vladimir Delba	Abkhazia	Acting Prime Minister: 3 March 2025 – 3 April 2025; Prime Minister: 3 April 2025 – present (Note: Vladimir Delba was Acting Prime Minister of Abkhazia from 2 June 2014 – 29 September 2014.)
3 March	Christian Stocker	Austria	Chancellor
10 March	Alexander Turchin	Belarus	Prime Minister
13 March	Konstantinos Tasoulas	Greece	President
14 March	Mark Carney	Canada	Prime Minister
18 March	Community Support Committee	Palestine (Hamas government in Gaza)	Government Administrative Committee
21 March	Netumbo Nandi-Ndaitwah	Namibia	President
21 March	Elijah Ngurare	Namibia	Prime Minister
21 March	Sara Zaafarani	Tunisia	Prime Minister
1 April	Martin Pfister	Switzerland	Federal Councilor
10 April	Brigitte Haas	Liechtenstein	Prime Minister
15 April	Mohamed Hamdan Dagalo	Sudan (Government of Peace and Unity) (Note: See also Sudan Founding Alliance.)	Chairman of the Presidential Council
16 April	Đuro Macut	Serbia	Prime Minister
1 May	Kamla Persad-Bissessar	Trinidad and Tobago	Prime Minister (Note: Kamla Persad-Bissessar was Prime Minister of Trinidad and Tobago from 26 May 2010 – 9 September 2015.)
3 May	Jean-Lucien Savi de Tové	Togo	President
6 May	Friedrich Merz	Germany	Chancellor
8 May	Leo XIV	Vatican City	Sovereign
19 May	Kamil Idris	Sudan	Prime Minister
26 May	Nicușor Dan	Romania	President
31 May	Josep-Lluís Serrano Pentinat	Andorra	Episcopal Co-Prince
4 June	Lee Jae Myung	South Korea	President
16 July	Jennifer Geerlings-Simons	Suriname	President
21 July	Christophe Mirmand	Monaco	Minister of State
25 July	Justin Nsengiyumva	Rwanda	Prime Minister
26 July	Mohammed Hassan al-Ta'ishi	Sudan (Government of Peace and Unity)	Prime Minister
5 August	Nestor Ntahontuye	Burundi	Prime Minister
6 August	Karol Nawrocki	Poland	President
28 August	Sifi Ghrieb	Algeria	Acting Prime Minister: 28 August 2025 – 14 September 2025; Prime Minister: 14 September 2025 – present
30 August	Muhammad Ahmed Miftah	Yemen (Supreme Political Council)	Acting Prime Minister
7 September	Anutin Charnvirakul	Thailand	Prime Minister
10 September	Sébastien Lecornu	France	Prime Minister
16 September	Laʻauli Leuatea Schmidt	Samoa	Prime Minister
4 October	Peter Mutharika	Malawi	President (Note: Peter Mutharika was President of Malawi from 31 May 2014 – 28 June 2020.)
17 October	Michael Randrianirina	Madagascar	President of the Council of the Presidency for the Re-Foundation of the Republic: 17 October 2025 – present; President: 17 October 2025 – present
21 October	Sanae Takaichi	Japan	Prime Minister
24 October	Tufan Erhürman	Northern Cyprus	President (Note: Tufan Erhürman was Prime Minister of Northern Cyprus from 2 February 2018 – 22 May 2019.)
26 October	Patrick Herminie	Seychelles	President
8 November	Rodrigo Paz	Bolivia	President
11 November	Catherine Connolly	Ireland	President
13 November	Mwigulu Nchemba	Tanzania	Prime Minister
27 November	Horta Inta-A Na Man	Guinea-Bissau	Leader of the High Military Command for the Restoration of National Security and Public Order: 27 November 2025 – present; Transitional President: 27 November 2025 – present
28 November	Ilídio Vieira Té	Guinea-Bissau	Prime Minister
28 November	Godwin Friday	Saint Vincent and the Grenadines	Prime Minister
30 November	Jeffrey Bostic	Barbados	President
9 December	Andrej Babiš	Czech Republic	Prime Minister (Note: Andrej Babiš was Prime Minister of the Czech Republic from 6 December 2017 – 17 December 2021.)
18 December	Fatafehi Fakafānua	Tonga	Prime Minister

=== 2026 ===
Assumed office	Leader	State	Office
3 January	Delcy Rodríguez	Venezuela	Acting President
6 January	Stanley John	Saint Vincent and the Grenadines	Governor-General
15 January	Shaya al-Zindani	Yemen	Prime Minister (Note: The office of Prime Minister of Yemen has been in dispute since 15 January 2026 with Muhammad Ahmed Miftah, prime minister of the Supreme Political Council government.)
23 January	Iliana Iotova	Bulgaria	President
27 January	Nasry Asfura	Honduras	President
17 February	Tarique Rahman	Bangladesh	Prime Minister
23 February	Rob Jetten	Netherlands	Prime Minister
8 March	Mojtaba Khamenei	Iran	Supreme Leader
9 March	António José Seguro	Portugal	President
11 March	José Antonio Kast	Chile	President
15 March	Mamitiana Rajaonarison	Madagascar	Prime Minister
27 March	Balen Shah	Nepal	Prime Minister
31 March	Nyam-Osoryn Uchral	Mongolia	Prime Minister
7 April	Lê Minh Hưng	Vietnam	Prime Minister
12 April	Nizar Amidi	Iraq	President
8 May	Rumen Radev	Bulgaria	Prime Minister (Note: Rumen Radev was President of Bulgaria from 22 January 2017 – 23 January 2026.)
8 May	Laura Fernández	Costa Rica	President
9 May	Péter Magyar	Hungary	Prime Minister
14 May	Ali al-Zaidi	Iraq	Prime Minister
15 May	Matthew Wale	Solomon Islands	Prime Minister
24 May	Romuald Wadagni	Benin	President
25 May	Ahmadou Al Aminou Lo	Senegal	Prime Minister
28 May	Andris Kulbergs	Latvia	Prime Minister
4 June	Janez Janša	Slovenia	Prime Minister (Note: Janez Janša was Prime Minister of Slovenia from 3 December 2004 – 21 November 2008, 10 February 2012 – 20 March 2013, and 13 March 2020 – 1 June 2022.)
6 June	Frédéric Rose	Andorra	Personal Representative of the French Co-Prince
8 June	Louise Arbour	Canada	Governor General
16 June	Marat Kambolov	South Ossetia	Prime Minister: 16 June 2026 – 30 September 2026; Acting President: 23 June 2026 – 30 September 2026; President: 30 September 2026 – present
19 June	Francisco Carvalho	Cape Verde	Prime Minister
1 July	Louis Crishock	Bosnia and Herzegovina	Acting High Representative
1 July	Han Seong-sook	South Korea	Prime Minister
14 July	Mindaugas Sinkevičius	Lithuania	Prime Minister
16 July	Serhii Koretskyi	Ukraine	Prime Minister
20 July	Andy Burnham	United Kingdom	Prime Minister
22 July	Vasile Tofan	Moldova	Prime Minister
28 July	Keiko Fujimori	Peru	President
28 July	Luis Galarreta	Peru	Prime Minister
1 August	Felix Finisterre	Saint Lucia	Acting Governor-General
7 August	Abelardo de la Espriella	Colombia	President
18 August	Haakon VIII	Norway	Prince-Regent: 18 – 28 August 2026 (Note: Haakon was Prince-Regent of Norway from 25 November 2003 – 13 April 2004, 29 March 2005 – 7 June 2005, 25 September – 31 October 2020, and 3 March – 22 April 2024.); King: 28 August 2026 – present
19 August	András Baka	Hungary	President
21 August	Mirza Fakhrul Islam Alamgir	Bangladesh	President
29 September	Fatima Ezzahra El Mansouri	Morocco	Prime Minister
30 September	Temukisa Auina Penehuro Hauma	Tuvalu	Governor-General
1 October	Gerardo Giovagnoli	San Marino	Captain Regent
1 October	William Casali	San Marino	Captain Regent
5 October	Saleumxay Kommasith	Laos	Prime Minister
7 October	Justina Shiroka Pula	Kosovo	President
12 October	Ülle Madise	Estonia	President
20 October	Luca Niculescu	Romania	Prime Minister
22 October	Soslan Margiev	South Ossetia	Prime Minister
6 November	Pedro Alliana	Paraguay	President
16 November	Darijana Filipović	Bosnia and Herzegovina	Presidency Member
19 November	Sandagiin Byambatsogt	Mongolia	Acting President
19 November	Aleksandar Čupić	Serbia	Acting President

== List of upcoming leaders ==
Taking office	Leader	State	Office

== See also ==
- Life tenure
- List of current heads of state and government
- List of current prime ministers by date of assumption of office
- List of heads of state by diplomatic precedence
- List of longest-living state leaders
- List of current reigning monarchs by length of reign
- List of oldest living state leaders
- List of state leaders by age
- List of current presidents of legislatures
- List of heads of the executive by approval rating
- List of political term limits
- Term limit
- Term of office
