= List of current heads of state and government =

This is a list of current heads of state and heads of government. In some cases, mainly in presidential systems, one leader is head of state and head of government. In other cases, mainly in semi-presidential and parliamentary systems, the head of state and the head of government are different people. In semi-presidential and parliamentary systems, the head of government (i.e. executive) role is fulfilled by the listed head of government and the head of state.

In one-party states, the ruling party's leader (e.g. the general secretary) is usually the de facto top leader of the state, though sometimes this leader also holds the presidency or premiership. In Afghanistan, Andorra, Iran, and Vatican City (Holy See), a clergy member also acts as the head of state. In Afghanistan, this is the Supreme Leader; in Andorra, this is the bishop of Urgell, Co-prince of Andorra; and in the Vatican City, this is the pope.

The list includes the names of recently elected or appointed heads of state and government who will take office on an appointed date, as presidents-elect and prime ministers–designate, and those leading a government-in-exile if internationally recognised.

== Member and observer states of the United Nations ==
Colour key
Green cells indicate leaders whose offices constitutionally administer the executive of their respective state/government.
Blue cells indicate de facto executive leaders whose offices lack de jure constitutional power.

Note: Names in small font generally denote acting, interim, transitional, temporary leaders, or representatives and Italics represents designated and incoming leaders yet to assume power. Other notes and exceptions are provided at § Notes.

State	Head of state	Head of government
Afghanistan	Supreme Leader – Hibatullah Akhundzada	Prime Minister – Hasan Akhund
Albania	President – Bajram Begaj	Prime Minister – Edi Rama
Algeria	President – Abdelmadjid Tebboune	Prime Minister – Sifi Ghrieb
Andorra	Episcopal Co-Prince – Josep-Lluís Serrano Pentinat	Prime Minister – Xavier Espot Zamora
Andorra	Episcopal Personal Representative – Eduard Ibáñez	Prime Minister – Xavier Espot Zamora
Andorra	French Co-Prince – Emmanuel Macron (Note: The President of France and the French Co-Prince of Andorra are positions held by the same person.)	Prime Minister – Xavier Espot Zamora
Andorra	French Personal Representative – Frédéric Rose	Prime Minister – Xavier Espot Zamora
Angola	President – João Lourenço	
Antigua and Barbuda	King – Charles III (Note: Charles III is separately and equally monarch of 15 sovereign states known collectively as the Commonwealth realms. In each of these states (with the exception of the United Kingdom, where he resides), he is represented at the national level by a governor-general.)	Prime Minister – Gaston Browne
Antigua and Barbuda	Governor-General – Rodney Williams	Prime Minister – Gaston Browne
Argentina	President – Javier Milei	
Armenia	President – Vahagn Khachaturyan	Prime Minister – Nikol Pashinyan
Australia	King – Charles III	Prime Minister – Anthony Albanese
Australia	Governor-General – Sam Mostyn	Prime Minister – Anthony Albanese
Austria	President – Alexander Van der Bellen	Chancellor – Christian Stocker
Azerbaijan	President – Ilham Aliyev	Prime Minister – Ali Asadov
Bahamas, The	King – Charles III	Prime Minister – Philip Davis
Bahamas, The	Governor-General – Cynthia A. Pratt	Prime Minister – Philip Davis
Bahrain	King – Hamad bin Isa Al Khalifa	Prime Minister – Salman bin Hamad Al Khalifa
Bangladesh	President – Mirza Fakhrul Islam Alamgir	Prime Minister – Tarique Rahman
Barbados	President – Jeffrey Bostic	Prime Minister – Mia Mottley
Belarus	Chairman of the All-Belarusian People's Assembly – Alexander Lukashenko	
Belarus	President – Alexander Lukashenko	Prime Minister – Alexander Turchin
Belgium	King – Philippe	Prime Minister – Bart De Wever
Belize	King – Charles III	Prime Minister – Johnny Briceño
Belize	Governor-General – Froyla Tzalam	Prime Minister – Johnny Briceño
Benin	President – Romuald Wadagni	
Bhutan	King – Jigme Khesar Namgyel Wangchuck	Prime Minister – Tshering Tobgay
Bolivia	President – Rodrigo Paz	
Bosnia and Herzegovina	Acting High Representative – Louis Crishock (Note: The high representative is an international civilian overseer of the Dayton Agreement with authority to dismiss elected and non-elected officials and enact legislation.)	
Bosnia and Herzegovina	Presidency (Note: The three-member Bosnian presidency is the head of state collectively.)	Chairwoman of the Council of Ministers – Borjana Krišto
Bosnia and Herzegovina	Members: Željka Cvijanović (Serb member and Chairwoman); Denis Bećirović (Bosniak member); Darijana Filipović (Croat member)	Chairwoman of the Council of Ministers – Borjana Krišto
Botswana	President – Duma Boko	
Brazil	President – Luiz Inácio Lula da Silva	
Brunei	Sultan – Hassanal Bolkiah	Prime Minister – Hassanal Bolkiah
Bulgaria	President – Iliana Iotova	Prime Minister – Rumen Radev
Burkina Faso	President of the Patriotic Movement for Safeguard and Restoration – Ibrahim Traoré	
Burkina Faso	Interim President – Ibrahim Traoré	Interim Prime Minister – Jean Emmanuel Ouédraogo
Burundi	President – Évariste Ndayishimiye	Prime Minister – Nestor Ntahontuye (Note: While the position of prime minister formally exists as head of government, the president serves as de facto head of government.)
Cambodia	President of the People's Party – Hun Sen	
Cambodia	King – Norodom Sihamoni	Prime Minister – Hun Manet
Cameroon	President – Paul Biya	Prime Minister – Joseph Ngute
Canada	King – Charles III	Prime Minister – Mark Carney
Canada	Governor General – Louise Arbour	Prime Minister – Mark Carney
Cape Verde	President – José Maria Neves	Prime Minister – Francisco Carvalho
Central African Republic	President – Faustin-Archange Touadéra	Prime Minister – Félix Moloua
Chad	President – Mahamat Déby	Prime Minister – Allamaye Halina
Chile	President – José Antonio Kast	
China	General Secretary of the Communist Party – Xi Jinping	
China	President – Xi Jinping (Note: Constitutionally the President of China is only the state representative and not head of state but the two roles are functionally the same.)	Premier – Li Qiang
Colombia	President – Abelardo de la Espriella	
Comoros	President – Azali Assoumani	
Congo, Democratic Republic of the	President – Félix Tshisekedi	Prime Minister – Judith Suminwa
Congo, Republic of the	President – Denis Sassou Nguesso	Prime Minister – Anatole Collinet Makosso
Costa Rica	President – Laura Fernández	
Croatia	President – Zoran Milanović	Prime Minister – Andrej Plenković
Cuba	First Secretary of the Communist Party – Miguel Díaz-Canel (Note: Former First Secretary and President Raúl Castro is also considered to be the de facto leader by some sources.)	
Cuba	President – Miguel Díaz-Canel	Prime Minister – Manuel Marrero Cruz
Cyprus	President – Nikos Christodoulides	
Czech Republic	President – Petr Pavel	Prime Minister – Andrej Babiš
Denmark	King – Frederik X	Prime Minister – Mette Frederiksen
Djibouti	President – Ismaïl Omar Guelleh	
Dominica	President – Sylvanie Burton	Prime Minister – Roosevelt Skerrit
Dominican Republic	President – Luis Abinader	
Ecuador	President – Daniel Noboa	
Egypt	President – Abdel Fattah el-Sisi	Prime Minister – Mostafa Madbouly
El Salvador	President – Nayib Bukele	
Equatorial Guinea	President – Teodoro Obiang Nguema Mbasogo	Prime Minister – Manuel Osa Nsue Nsua
Eritrea	President – Isaias Afwerki	
Estonia	President – Ülle Madise	Prime Minister – Kristen Michal
Eswatini	King – Mswati III	Prime Minister – Russell Dlamini
Eswatini	Queen Mother – Ntfombi	Prime Minister – Russell Dlamini
Ethiopia	President – Taye Atske Selassie	Prime Minister – Abiy Ahmed
Fiji	President – Naiqama Lalabalavu	Prime Minister – Sitiveni Rabuka
Finland	President – Alexander Stubb	Prime Minister – Petteri Orpo
France	President – Emmanuel Macron	Prime Minister – Sébastien Lecornu
Gabon	President – Brice Oligui Nguema	
Gambia, The	President – Adama Barrow	
Georgia	Honorary Chairman of Georgian Dream – Bidzina Ivanishvili	
Georgia	President – Mikheil Kavelashvili	Prime Minister – Irakli Kobakhidze
Germany	President – Frank-Walter Steinmeier	Chancellor – Friedrich Merz
Ghana	President – John Mahama	
Greece	President – Konstantinos Tasoulas	Prime Minister – Kyriakos Mitsotakis
Grenada	King – Charles III	Prime Minister – Dickon Mitchell
Grenada	Governor-General – Cécile La Grenade	Prime Minister – Dickon Mitchell
Guatemala	President – Bernardo Arévalo	
Guinea	President – Mamady Doumbouya	Prime Minister – Bah Oury
Guinea-Bissau	Chief of the High Command – Horta Inta-A Na Man	
Guinea-Bissau	Transitional President – Horta Inta-A Na Man	Prime Minister – Ilídio Vieira Té
Guyana	President – Irfaan Ali	
Haiti	President – Vacant (Note: Duties temporarily exercised by the Council of Ministers.)	Acting Prime Minister – Alix Didier Fils-Aimé
Honduras	President – Nasry Asfura	
Hungary	President – András Baka	Prime Minister – Péter Magyar
Iceland	President – Halla Tómasdóttir	Prime Minister – Kristrún Frostadóttir
India	President – Droupadi Murmu	Prime Minister – Narendra Modi
Indonesia	President – Prabowo Subianto	
Iran	Supreme Leader (Note: Head of Executive and de facto head of state.) – Mojtaba Khamenei	
Iran	President (Note: Acting Head of the Executive Branch except in matters directly related to the Supreme Leader.) – Masoud Pezeshkian	
Iraq	President – Nizar Amidi	Prime Minister – Ali al-Zaidi
Ireland	President – Catherine Connolly	Taoiseach – Micheál Martin
Israel	President – Isaac Herzog	Caretaker Prime Minister – Benjamin Netanyahu
Italy	President – Sergio Mattarella	Prime Minister – Giorgia Meloni
Ivory Coast	President – Alassane Ouattara	Prime Minister – Robert Beugré Mambé
Jamaica	King – Charles III	Prime Minister – Andrew Holness
Jamaica	Governor-General – Patrick Allen	Prime Minister – Andrew Holness
Japan	Emperor – Naruhito (Note: The constitution of Japan does not define a formal head of state, but the Emperor by unwritten constitutional convention fulfills the functions and duties of this role.)	Prime Minister – Sanae Takaichi
Jordan	King – Abdullah II	Prime Minister – Jafar Hassan
Kazakhstan	President – Kassym-Jomart Tokayev	Prime Minister – Oljas Bektenov
Kenya	President – William Ruto	
Kiribati	President – Taneti Maamau	
Kuwait	Emir – Mishal Al-Ahmad Al-Jaber Al-Sabah	Prime Minister – Ahmad Al-Abdullah Al-Sabah
Kyrgyzstan	President – Sadyr Japarov	
Laos	General Secretary of the People's Revolutionary Party – Thongloun Sisoulith	
Laos	President – Thongloun Sisoulith	Prime Minister – Saleumxay Kommasith
Latvia	President – Edgars Rinkēvičs	Prime Minister – Andris Kulbergs
Lebanon	President – Joseph Aoun	Prime Minister – Nawaf Salam
Lesotho	King – Letsie III	Prime Minister – Sam Matekane
Liberia	President – Joseph Boakai	
Libya (GNU)	Chairman of the Presidential Council – Mohamed al-Menfi	Prime Minister – Abdul Hamid Dbeibeh
Liechtenstein	Prince – Hans-Adam II	Prime Minister – Brigitte Haas
Liechtenstein	Regent – Alois	Prime Minister – Brigitte Haas
Lithuania	President – Gitanas Nausėda	Prime Minister – Mindaugas Sinkevičius
Luxembourg	Grand Duke – Guillaume V	Prime Minister – Luc Frieden
Madagascar	President of the Council of the Presidency for the Re-Foundation of the Republic – Michael Randrianirina	
Madagascar	President – Michael Randrianirina	Prime Minister – Mamitiana Rajaonarison
Malawi	President – Peter Mutharika	
Malaysia	King – Ibrahim Iskandar	Prime Minister – Anwar Ibrahim
Maldives	President – Mohamed Muizzu	
Mali	President – Assimi Goita	
Malta	President – Myriam Spiteri Debono	Prime Minister – Robert Abela
Marshall Islands	President – Hilda Heine	
Mauritania	President – Mohamed Ould Ghazouani	Prime Minister – Mokhtar Ould Djay
Mauritius	President – Dharam Gokhool	Prime Minister – Navin Ramgoolam
Mexico	President – Claudia Sheinbaum	
Micronesia, Federated States of	President – Wesley Simina	
Moldova	President – Maia Sandu	Prime Minister – Vasile Tofan
Monaco	Sovereign Prince – Albert II	Minister of State – Christophe Mirmand
Mongolia	Acting President – Sandagiin Byambatsogt	Prime Minister – Nyam-Osoryn Uchral
Montenegro	President – Jakov Milatović	Prime Minister – Milojko Spajić
Morocco	King – Mohammed VI	Prime Minister – Fatima Ezzahra El Mansouri
Mozambique	President – Daniel Chapo	
Myanmar	President – Min Aung Hlaing	
Namibia	President – Netumbo Nandi-Ndaitwah	
Nauru	President – David Adeang	
Nepal	President – Ram Chandra Paudel	Prime Minister – Balen Shah
Netherlands	King – Willem-Alexander	Prime Minister – Rob Jetten
New Zealand	King – Charles III	Prime Minister – Christopher Luxon
New Zealand	Governor-General – Cindy Kiro (Note: The Governor-General of New Zealand also serves as governor-general in relation to Niue.)	Prime Minister – Christopher Luxon
Nicaragua	Co-Presidents – Daniel Ortega and Rosario Murillo	
Niger	President of the National Council for the Safeguard of the Homeland – Abdourahamane Tiani	
Niger	Transitional President – Abdourahamane Tiani	Prime Minister – Ali Lamine Zeine
Nigeria	President – Bola Tinubu	
North Korea	General Secretary of the Workers' Party – Kim Jong Un	
North Korea	President of the State Affairs Commission – Kim Jong Un	Premier – Pak Thae-song
North Macedonia	President – Gordana Siljanovska-Davkova	Prime Minister – Hristijan Mickoski
Norway	King – Haakon VIII	Prime Minister – Jonas Gahr Støre
Oman	Sultan – Haitham bin Tariq	Prime Minister – Haitham bin Tariq
Pakistan	President – Asif Ali Zardari	Prime Minister – Shehbaz Sharif
Palau	President – Surangel Whipps Jr.	
Palestine (Palestinian Authority)	President – Mahmoud Abbas	Prime Minister – Mohammad Mustafa
Panama	President – José Raúl Mulino	
Papua New Guinea	King – Charles III	Prime Minister – James Marape
Papua New Guinea	Governor-General – Bob Dadae	Prime Minister – James Marape
Paraguay	President – Pedro Alliana	
Peru	President – Keiko Fujimori	
Philippines	President – Bongbong Marcos	
Poland	President – Karol Nawrocki	Prime Minister – Donald Tusk
Portugal	President – António José Seguro	Prime Minister – Luís Montenegro
Qatar	Emir – Tamim bin Hamad Al Thani	Prime Minister – Mohammed bin Abdulrahman bin Jassim Al Thani
Romania	President – Nicușor Dan	Prime Minister – Luca Niculescu
Russia	President – Vladimir Putin	Prime Minister – Mikhail Mishustin
Rwanda	President – Paul Kagame	Prime Minister – Justin Nsengiyumva
Saint Kitts and Nevis	King – Charles III	Prime Minister – Terrance Drew
Saint Kitts and Nevis	Governor-General – Marcella Liburd	Prime Minister – Terrance Drew
Saint Lucia	King – Charles III	Prime Minister – Philip J. Pierre
Saint Lucia	Acting Governor-General – Felix Finisterre	Prime Minister – Philip J. Pierre
Saint Vincent and the Grenadines	King – Charles III	Prime Minister – Godwin Friday
Saint Vincent and the Grenadines	Governor-General – Stanley John	Prime Minister – Godwin Friday
Samoa	O le Ao o le Malo – Tuimalealiʻifano Vaʻaletoʻa Sualauvi II	Prime Minister – Laʻauli Leuatea Schmidt
San Marino	Captains Regent – Gerardo Giovagnoli and William Casali	Congress of State
San Marino	Captains Regent – Gerardo Giovagnoli and William Casali	Luca Beccari (Secretary for Foreign and Political Affairs) (Note: Secretary of State for Foreign and Political Affairs is often considered de facto head of government but this is not constitutionally defined.)
San Marino	Captains Regent – Gerardo Giovagnoli and William Casali	Other members: Andrea Belluzzi; Marco Gatti; Rossano Fabbri; Matteo Ciacci; Federico Pedini Amati; Massimo Andrea Ugolini; Teodoro Lonfernini; Alessandro Bevitori; Stefano Canti
São Tomé and Príncipe	President – Carlos Vila Nova	Prime Minister – Américo Ramos
Saudi Arabia	Crown Prince – Mohammed bin Salman	
Saudi Arabia	King – Salman	Prime Minister – Mohammed bin Salman
Senegal	President – Bassirou Diomaye Faye	Prime Minister – Ahmadou Al Aminou Lo
Serbia	Acting President – Aleksandar Čupić	Prime Minister – Đuro Macut
Seychelles	President – Patrick Herminie	
Sierra Leone	President – Julius Maada Bio	
Singapore	President – Tharman Shanmugaratnam	Prime Minister – Lawrence Wong
Slovakia	President – Peter Pellegrini	Prime Minister – Robert Fico
Slovenia	President – Nataša Pirc Musar	Prime Minister – Janez Janša
Solomon Islands	King – Charles III	Prime Minister – Matthew Wale
Solomon Islands	Governor-General – David Tiva Kapu	Prime Minister – Matthew Wale
Somalia	President – Hassan Sheikh Mohamud (Note: The presidency has been disputed since 15 May 2026, with Mohamud asserting that the constitutional amendments passed on 30 March 2024 extended his term as president until 15 May 2027. The opposition dispute the constitutional amendments as being invalid, stating that the constitutional term of Mohamud expired on 15 May 2026 in accordance with the provisional constitution of Somalia.)	Prime Minister – Hamza Abdi Barre
South Africa	President – Cyril Ramaphosa	
South Korea	President – Lee Jae Myung	
South Sudan	President – Salva Kiir	
Spain	King – Felipe VI	Prime Minister – Pedro Sánchez
Sri Lanka	President – Anura Kumara Dissanayake	
Sudan (TSC)	Transitional Sovereignty Council (Note: The Transitional Sovereignty Council is the collective head of state of Sudan per the 2019 Draft Constitutional Declaration. While the council was intended to be a unity government incorporating civilian and military elements that used consensus decision-making, Chairman Abdel Fattah al-Burhan, who is also Commander-in-Chief of the Sudanese Armed Forces, has monopolized power.)	Prime Minister – Kamil Idris
Sudan (TSC)	Abdel Fattah al-Burhan (President)	Prime Minister – Kamil Idris
Sudan (TSC)	Other members: Malik Agar (Vice President); Shams al-Din Kabbashi; Yasser al-Atta; Ibrahim Jaber; Salma Abdul Jabbar al-Mubarak; Salah al-Din Adam Tur; Abdullah Yahya Ahmed Hussein; Nawara Abu Muhammad Muhammad Taher	Prime Minister – Kamil Idris
Suriname	President – Jennifer Geerlings-Simons	
Sweden	King – Carl XVI Gustaf	Caretaker Prime Minister – Ulf Kristersson
Switzerland	Federal Council (Note: The seven-member Swiss Federal Council is collectively head of state and government. As a party to the Council, the President serves solely in a primus inter pares capacity for one year.)	
Switzerland	Members: Guy Parmelin (President); Ignazio Cassis (Vice President); Karin Keller-Sutter; Albert Rösti; Élisabeth Baume-Schneider; Beat Jans; Martin Pfister	
Syria	President – Ahmed al-Sharaa	
Tajikistan	President – Emomali Rahmon	Prime Minister – Qohir Rasulzoda
Tanzania	President – Samia Suluhu Hassan	
Thailand	King – Vajiralongkorn	Prime Minister – Anutin Charnvirakul
Timor-Leste	President – José Ramos-Horta	Prime Minister – Xanana Gusmão
Togo	President – Jean-Lucien Savi de Tové	Prime Minister – Faure Gnassingbé
Tonga	King – Tupou VI	Prime Minister – Fatafehi Fakafānua
Trinidad and Tobago	President – Christine Kangaloo	Prime Minister – Kamla Persad-Bissessar
Tunisia	President – Kais Saied	Prime Minister – Sara Zaafarani
Turkey	President – Recep Tayyip Erdoğan	
Turkmenistan	Chairman of the People's Council – Gurbanguly Berdimuhamedow	
Turkmenistan	President – Serdar Berdimuhamedow	
Tuvalu	King – Charles III	Prime Minister – Feleti Teo
Tuvalu	Governor-General – Temukisa Auina Penehuro Hauma	Prime Minister – Feleti Teo
Uganda	President – Yoweri Museveni	
Ukraine	President – Volodymyr Zelenskyy	Prime Minister – Serhii Koretskyi
United Arab Emirates	President – Mohamed bin Zayed Al Nahyan	Prime Minister – Mohammed bin Rashid Al Maktoum
United Kingdom	King – Charles III	Prime Minister – Andy Burnham
United States	President – Donald Trump	
Uruguay	President – Yamandú Orsi	
Uzbekistan	President – Shavkat Mirziyoyev	Prime Minister – Abdulla Aripov
Vanuatu	President – Nikenike Vurobaravu	Prime Minister – Jotham Napat
Vatican City (Holy See)	Pope – Leo XIV	President of the Governorate – Raffaella Petrini
Venezuela	Acting President – Delcy Rodríguez (Note: United States Secretary of State Marco Rubio is also considered to be the de facto leader by some sources.)	
Venezuela	President – Nicolás Maduro (Note: Maduro was captured by the United States on 3 January 2026 and extracted from Venezuela. Since then, Rodríguez has been the acting president.)	
Vietnam	General Secretary of the Communist Party – Tô Lâm	
Vietnam	President – Tô Lâm	Prime Minister – Lê Minh Hưng
Yemen (PLC)	President of the Presidential Leadership Council – Rashad al-Alimi	Prime Minister – Shaya al-Zindani
Zambia	President – Hakainde Hichilema	
Zimbabwe	President – Emmerson Mnangagwa	

== Other states ==
The following states are in free association with a UN member state.

State	Associated with	Head of state	Head of government
Cook Islands	New Zealand	King – Charles III (Note: Charles III is head of state of the Cook Islands and Niue in his capacity as King in Right of New Zealand.)	Prime Minister – Mark Brown
Cook Islands	New Zealand	King's Representative – Tom Marsters	Prime Minister – Mark Brown
Niue	New Zealand	King – Charles III	Prime Minister – Dalton Tagelagi
Niue	New Zealand	Governor-General – Cindy Kiro	Prime Minister – Dalton Tagelagi

The following states control at least part of their territory and are recognised by at least one UN member state.

State	Also claimed by	Head of state	Head of government
Abkhazia	Georgia	President – Badra Gunba	
Kosovo	Serbia	President – Justina Shiroka Pula	Prime Minister – Albin Kurti
Northern Cyprus	Cyprus	President – Tufan Erhürman	Prime Minister – Ünal Üstel
Sahrawi Arab Democratic Republic	Morocco	President – Brahim Ghali	Prime Minister – Bouchraya Hammoudi Bayoun
Somaliland	Somalia	President – Abdirahman Mohamed Abdullahi	
South Ossetia	Georgia	President – Marat Kambolov	Prime Minister – Soslan Margiev
Taiwan	China	President – Lai Ching-te	Premier – Cho Jung-tai

The following state controls its territory, but is not recognised by any UN member states.

State	Also claimed by	Head of state	Head of government
Transnistria	Moldova	President – Vadim Krasnoselsky	Prime Minister – Aleksander Rozenberg

== Alternative governments ==
This alternative government controls part of its territory and is recognised as legitimate by at least one UN member state.

Government	State	Head of state	Head of government
Supreme Political Council	Yemen	Leader of the Houthis – Abdul-Malik al-Houthi	
Supreme Political Council	Yemen	Chairman of the Supreme Political Council – Mahdi al-Mashat	Acting Prime Minister – Muhammad Miftah

These alternative governments control part of their territory, but are not recognized as legitimate by any UN member states.

Government	State	Head of state	Head of government
Government of National Stability	Libya	Supreme Commander of the Libyan National Army – Khalifa Haftar	
Government of National Stability	Libya	Chairman of the Presidential Council – Mohamed al-Menfi (Note: Al-Menfi is also considered head of state by the internationally-recognized Government of National Unity. Hamada is disputing the premiership of Abdul Hamid Dbeibeh, with the backing of the House of Representatives and the Libyan National Army.)	Acting Prime Minister – Osama Hammad
National Unity Government	Myanmar	Acting President – Duwa Lashi La	Prime Minister – Mahn Winn Khaing Thann
Government of Peace and Unity	Sudan	President of the Presidium of the Presidential Council – Hemedti	Transitional Prime Minister – Mohammed Hassan al-Ta'ishi

This alternative government does not control its territory but is recognized as legitimate by at least one UN member state.

Government	State	Head of state	Head of government
Coordination Council	Belarus	President and Head of the Cabinet – Sviatlana Tsikhanouskaya (Note: The European Parliament recognized the Coordination Council as a temporary representative body for the Belarusian people following the disputed 2020 Belarusian presidential election.)	

== Sui generis entities ==
Entity	Head of entity	Head of government
European Union	President of the European Council – António Costa	President of the European Commission – Ursula von der Leyen
Sovereign Military Order of Malta	Prince and Grand Master – John T. Dunlap	Grand Chancellor – Riccardo Paternò di Montecupo

== See also ==
- List of countries by system of government
- List of current state leaders by date of assumption of office
- List of current monarchs of sovereign states
- List of current vice presidents and designated acting presidents
- List of current interior ministers
- List of current foreign ministers
- List of current finance ministers
- List of current defence ministers
- List of current legislatures
- List of current presidents of legislatures
- List of elected or appointed female heads of state or government
- Colonial governors by century
- List of longest-living state leaders
- List of oldest living state leaders
- List of national governments
- Lists of state leaders
  - Lists of state leaders by century
    - List of state leaders in the 21st century
      - List of state leaders in the 2020s
- President of the Republic
- List of heads of the executive by approval rating
