= Next Libyan parliamentary election =

- By 17 February 2027

All 200 seats in the House of Representatives 101 seats needed for a majority
Incumbent Prime Minister
Abdul Hamid Dbeibeh
Independent

A parliamentary election is scheduled to be held in Libya by 17 February 2027 to elect the 200 members of the House of Representatives. The election will take place simultaneously with the presidential election. Originally scheduled for 10 December 2021, elections were pushed back several times because of the ongoing political crisis in Libya.

== Background ==
The Government on National Unity, headed by Abdul Hamid Dbeibeh, was established in March 2021 and was designed to serve in a caretaker role until a permanent government was established after elections were held. Originally planned for 7 December 2021, the date was moved to 24 December before finally being scrapped days before voting was to take place amid political deadlock and fighting in Tripoli.

Meanwhile, the House of Representatives which is based in eastern Libya, passed a motion of no confidence against the unity government on 21 September 2021. On 10 February 2022, the House appointed Fathi Bashagha as prime minister which established the rival Government of National Stability (GNS), based in Tobruk.

Dbeibeh refused to recognize the GNS or Bashagha, announcing on 22 February 2022 plans to hold elections in June. By May he pushed this proposal to the end of 2022, and later into 2023.

In March 2023, an amendment to the Libyan Constitution was passed by both the House of Representatives and the High Council of State containing thirty-four articles defining a new system of government and the tasks of the elected president and prime minister. However, many issues remained unresolved, casting doubt on the timing of the elections.

On 18 June 2026, the heads of the HoR, the High Council of State and the Presidential Council agreed on a plan for holding elections by 17 February 2027, based on the 6+6 electoral rules and the 13th Constitutional Amendment, and on other transitional procedures including a procedure for developing a permanent constitution.

== Candidates ==
=== 2021 cancelled election ===
According to the High National Elections Commission (HNEC), 5,385 candidates registered for the 2021 parliamentary election by 7 December 2021 deadline.
