= Libyan crisis =

Conflicts in Libya since 2011

- Part of the Arab Spring, Arab Winter, War on terror and the Insurgency in the Maghreb
- Military situation in Libya as of June 2020. (For an up-to-date, interactive, detailed map, see here.)
Date	15 February 2011 – present (15 years, 8 months, 4 weeks and 2 days)
Location	Libya, North Africa, Africa

Belligerents
As of April 2026: Government of National Unity (Tripoli-based) (recognized by UN)	As of April 2026: Government of National Stability (Benghazi-based)

Units involved
As of April 2026: Libyan Armed Forces; Libyan Army; Libyan Air Force; Libyan Navy Allies: Tuareg militias of Ghat; Toubou Front for the Salvation of Libya (since 2019); Southern Liberation Operations Room (since 2026)	As of April 2026: Libyan National Army; Tariq Ben Zeyad Brigade Allies: Toubou Front for the Salvation of Libya (2014-2019); Gaddafi loyalists; Popular Front for the Liberation of Libya; Libyan Popular National Movement; Warshefana militias

The Libyan crisis is the current humanitarian crisis and political-military instability occurring in Libya, beginning with the Arab Spring protests of 2011, which led to two civil wars, foreign military intervention, and the ousting and killing of Muammar Gaddafi. The first civil war's aftermath and proliferation of armed groups led to violence and instability across the country, which erupted into renewed civil war in 2014. The second war lasted until 23 October 2020, when all parties agreed to a permanent ceasefire and negotiations.

The crisis in Libya has resulted in tens of thousands of casualties since the onset of violence in early 2011. During both civil wars, the output of Libya's economically crucial oil industry collapsed to a small fraction of its usual level, despite having the largest oil reserves of any African country, with most facilities blockaded or damaged by rival groups. The parallels between the revolutions in Libya and Syria are sometimes viewed in opposition to each other.

Since March 2022, two different governments control the country: the Tripoli-based and internationally recognized Government of National Unity, which controls the western part of the country and is led by Abdul Hamid Dbeibeh; and the House of Representatives-recognized Government of National Stability, which nominally governs the central and eastern part of Libya and is led by Osama Hammad under the de facto rule of the Libyan National Army and its commander Khalifa Haftar.

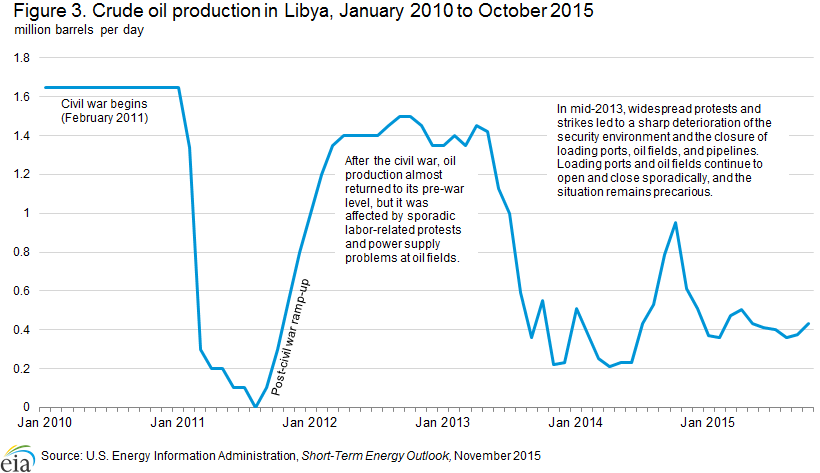
Libyan oil production collapsed during the two civil wars.

The war has caused a significant loss of economic potential in Libya, estimated at 783.2 billion Libyan dinars from 2011 to 2021. By 2022, the humanitarian situation had improved, though challenges remain.

== Background ==
The history of Libya under Muammar Gaddafi spanned 42 years from 1969 to 2011. Gaddafi became the de facto leader of the country on 1 September 1969, after leading a group of young Libyan military officers against King Idris I in a nonviolent revolution and bloodless coup d'état. After the king fled the country, the Libyan Revolutionary Command Council (RCC) headed by Gaddafi abolished the monarchy and the old constitution and proclaimed the new Libyan Arab Republic, with the motto "freedom, socialism, and unity".

After coming to power, the RCC government took control of all petroleum companies operating in the country and initiated a process of directing funds toward providing education, health care and housing for all. Despite the reforms not being entirely effective, public education in the country became free and primary education compulsory for both sexes. Medical care became available to the public at no cost, but providing housing for all was a task that the government was not able to complete. Under Gaddafi, per capita income in the country rose to more than US$11,000, the fifth-highest in Africa. The increase in prosperity was accompanied by a controversial foreign policy and increased political repression at home.

== Military and civilian conflicts ==
Evolution in the V-Dem Democracy Indices for Libyan electoral and liberal democracy show a positive spike in 2011 and weakening democracy levels during the following decade and a half.

=== First civil war (2011) ===
In early 2011, protests erupted with tens of thousands of Libyans taking to the streets demanding a democratic change in government as well as justice for the ones who suffered under Muammer Gaddafi's rule. These peaceful protests were faced with large violent crackdowns with government troops shooting protestors and allegedly running them over with tanks. A civil war eventually broke out. The anti-Gaddafi forces formed a committee named the National Transitional Council, on 27 February 2011. It was meant to act as an interim authority in the rebel-controlled areas. After the government began to roll back the rebels and a number of atrocities were committed by both sides, a multinational coalition led by NATO forces intervened on 21 March 2011, with the stated intention to protect civilians against attacks by the government's forces. Shortly thereafter, the International Criminal Court issued an arrest warrant against Gaddafi and his entourage on 27 June 2011. Gaddafi was ousted from power in the wake of the fall of Tripoli to the rebel forces on 20 August 2011, although pockets of resistance held by forces loyal to Gaddafi's government held out for another two months, especially in Gaddafi's hometown of Sirte, which he declared the new capital of Libya on 1 September 2011. His Jamahiriya regime came to an end the following month, culminating on 20 October 2011 with Sirte's capture, NATO airstrikes against Gaddafi's escape convoy, and his killing by rebel fighters.

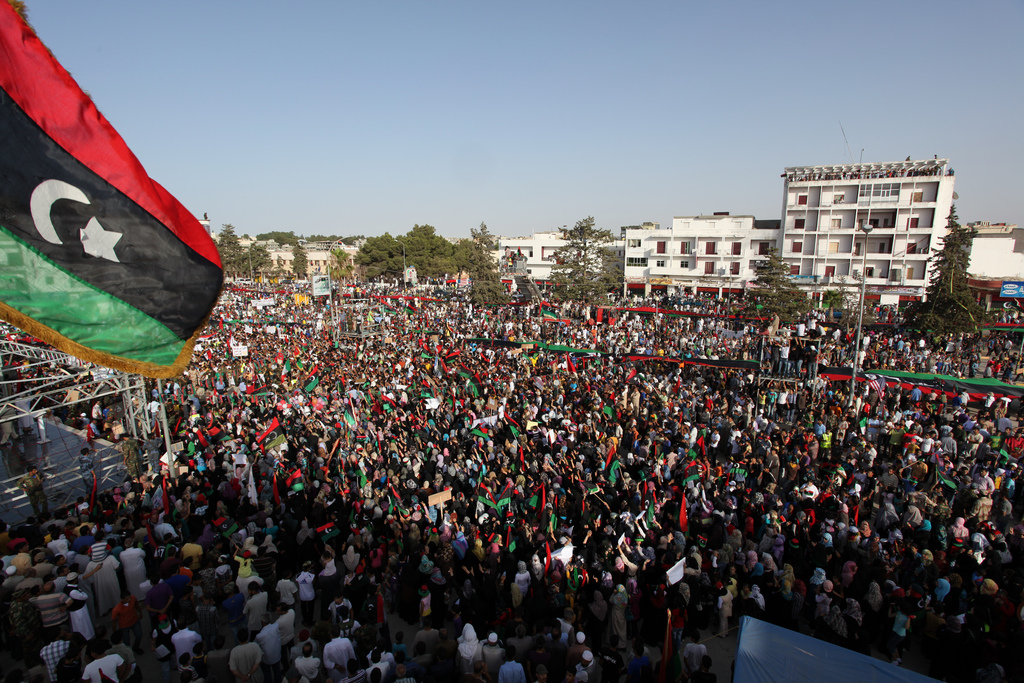
Demonstrations against the government during the first civil war

=== Factional violence (2011–2014) ===
The Libyan revolution led to defected regime military members who joined rebel forces, revolutionary brigades that defected from the Libyan Army, post-revolutionary brigades, militias, and various other armed groups, many composed of ordinary workers and students. Some of the armed groups formed during the war against the regime and others evolved later for security purposes. Some were based on tribal allegiances. The groups formed in different parts of the country and varied considerably in size, capability, and influence. They were not united as one body, but they were not necessarily at odds with one another. Revolutionary brigades accounted for the majority of skilled and experienced fighters and weapons. Some militias evolved from criminal networks to violent extremist gangs, quite different from the brigades seeking to provide protection.

After the first Libyan civil war, violence occurred involving various armed groups who fought against Gaddafi but refused to lay down their arms when the war ended in October 2011. Some brigades and militias shifted from merely delaying the surrender of their weapons to actively asserting a continuing political role as "guardians of the revolution", with hundreds of local armed groups filling the complex security vacuum left by the fall of Gaddafi. Before the official end of hostilities between loyalist and opposition forces, there were reports of sporadic clashes between rival militias and vigilante revenge killings.

In dealing with the number of unregulated armed groups, the National Transitional Council called for all armed groups to register and unite under the ministry of defense, thus placing many armed groups on the payroll of the government. This gave a degree of legitimacy to many armed groups, including General Khalifa Haftar who registered his armed group as the "Libyan National Army", the same name he used for his anti-Gaddafi forces after the 1980s Chadian–Libyan conflict.

On 11 September 2012, militants allied with Al-Qaeda attacked the US consulate in Benghazi, killing the US ambassador and three others. This prompted a popular outcry against the semi-legal militias that were still operating, and resulted in the storming of several Islamist militia bases by protesters. A large-scale government crackdown followed on non-sanctioned militias, with the Libyan Army raiding several now-illegal militias' headquarters and ordering them to disband. The violence eventually escalated into the second Libyan civil war.

=== Second civil war (2014–2020) ===
The second Libyan civil war was a conflict among rival groups seeking control of the territory of Libya. The conflict has been mostly between the government of the House of Representatives, also known as the "Tobruk government", which was assigned as a result of a very low-turnout elections in 2014 and was internationally recognized as the "Libyan Government" until the establishment of Government of National Accord (GNA); and the rival Islamist government of the General National Congress (GNC), also called the "National Salvation Government", based in the capital Tripoli. In December 2015, these two factions agreed in principle to unite as the Government of National Accord.

The Tobruk government, strongest in eastern Libya, has the loyalty of Haftar's Libyan National Army and has been supported with air strikes by Egypt and the UAE. The Islamist government of the GNC, strongest in western Libya, rejected the results of the 2014 election, and is led by the Muslim Brotherhood, backed by the wider Islamist coalition known as "Libya Dawn" and other militias, and aided by Qatar, Sudan, and Turkey.

In addition to these, there are also smaller rival groups: the Islamist Shura Council of Benghazi Revolutionaries, led by Ansar al-Sharia (Libya), which has had the support of the GNC; the Islamic State of Iraq and the Levant's (ISIL's) Libyan provinces; as well as Tuareg militias of Ghat, controlling desert areas in the southwest; and local forces in Misrata District, controlling the towns of Bani Walid and Tawergha. The belligerents are coalitions of armed groups that sometimes change sides.

Since 2015, there have been many political developments. The United Nations brokered a cease-fire in December 2015, and on 31 March 2016 the leaders of a new UN-supported "unity government" arrived in Tripoli. On 5 April, the Islamist government in western Libya announced that it was suspending operations and handing power to the new unity government, officially named the "Government of National Accord", although it was not yet clear whether the new arrangement would succeed. On 2 July, rival leaders reached an agreement to reunify the eastern and western managements of Libya's National Oil Corporation (NOC). As of 22 August, the unity government still had not received the approval of Haftar's supporters in the Tobruk government, and on 11 September the general boosted his political leverage by seizing control of two key oil terminals. Haftar and the NOC then reached an agreement for increasing oil production and exports, and all nine of Libya's major oil terminals were operating again in January 2017.

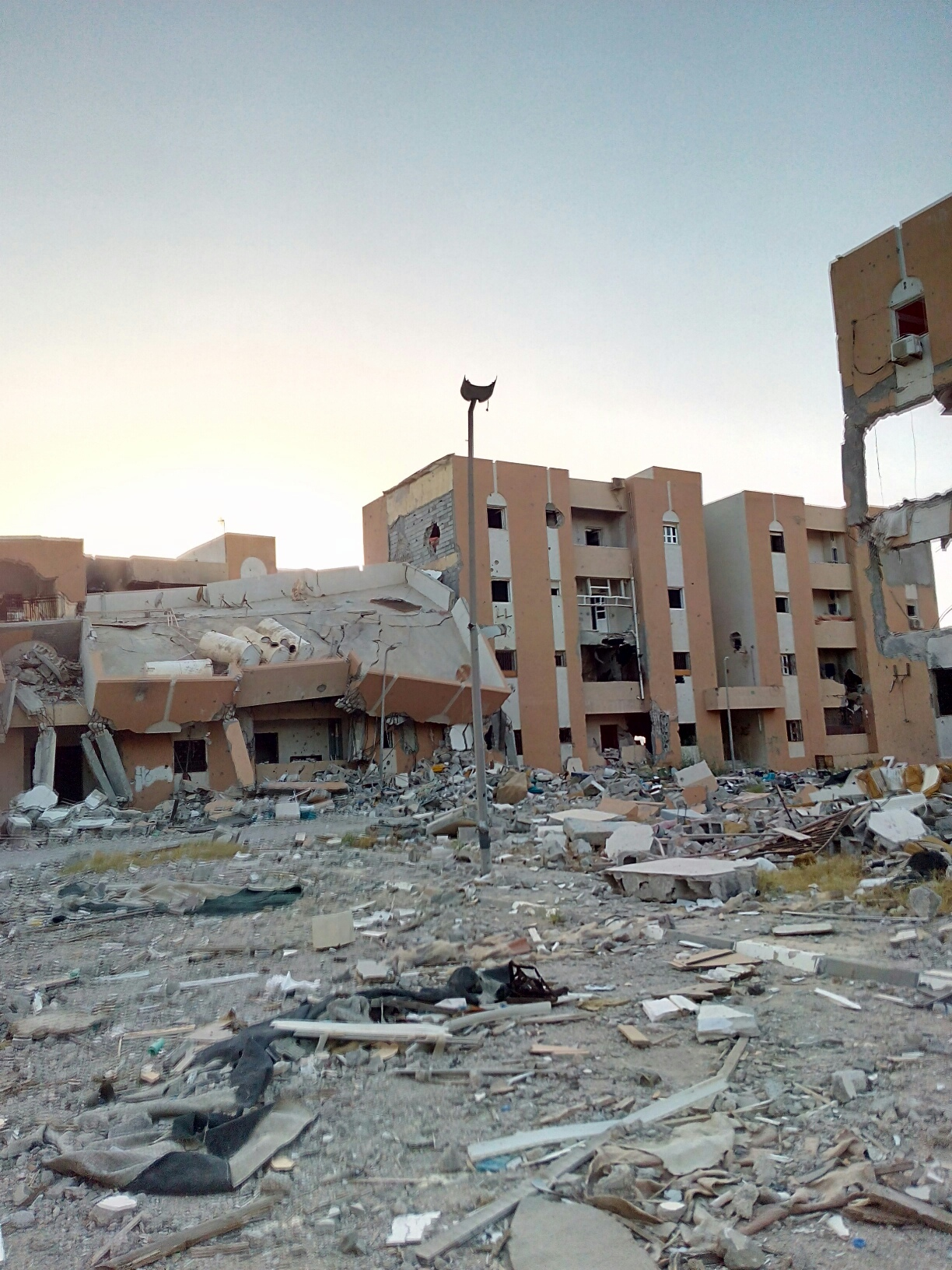
Damaged buildings in Sirte

In December 2017, the Libyan National Army seized Benghazi after three years of fighting. In February 2019, the LNA achieved victory in the Battle of Derna. The LNA then launched a major offensive in April 2019 in an attempt to seize Tripoli. On 5 June 2020, the GNA captured all of western Libya, including the capital Tripoli. The next day the GNA launched an offensive to capture Sirte. However, they proved unable to advance. On 21 August, the GNA and the LNA both agreed to a ceasefire. Khalifa Haftar, Field Marshal of the LNA, rejected the ceasefire and LNA spokesman Ahmed al-Mismari dismissed the GNA's ceasefire announcement as a ploy. On 23 August, street protests took place in Tripoli, where hundreds protested against the GNA for living conditions and corruption within the government.

On 23 October 2020, the UN disclosed that a permanent ceasefire deal had been reached between the two rival forces in Libya. The nationwide ceasefire agreement is set to ensure that all foreign forces, alongside mercenaries, have left the country for at least three months. All military forces and armed groups at the trenches are expected to retreat back to their camps, the UN's envoy to Libya, Stephanie Williams added. The eastern city of Benghazi witnessed the landing of the first commercial passenger flight from Tripoli on the same day, which had not happened for over a year and is perceived to be an indication of success of the deal.

=== Political instability and clashes (since 2021) ===
On 10 March 2021, an interim unity government was formed, and the Government of National Accord was dissolved. The GNU was slated to remain in place until the next Libyan presidential election scheduled for 10 December. However, the election has been delayed several times since, effectively rendering the unity government in power indefinitely, causing tensions which threaten to reignite the war.

The House of Representatives, which rules eastern Libya, passed a no-confidence motion against the unity government on 21 September 2021. On 3 March 2022 a rival Government of National Stability (GNS) was installed in Sirte, under the leadership of Prime Minister Fathi Bashagha. The decision was denounced as illegitimate by the High Council of State and condemned by the United Nations. Both governments have been functioning simultaneously, which has led to dual power in Libya. The Libyan Political Dialogue Forum keeps corresponding with ceasefire agreement.

In 2022, fighting yet again resumed between factions of the GNU and the recently formed GNS in Tripoli. The GNS was formed to rival the GNU although the GNU saw the creation of the government as illegitimate. The GNU is considered to be the internationally recognized government and has mainly been backed by Turkey whereas the GNS has been supported by the House of Representatives and the Libyan National Army. Fighting between the two factions escalated on 27 August 2022.

Drone strikes against Wagner Group-affiliated assets near the al-Kharrouba air base near Benghazi occurred on 30 June 2023. No casualties were reported, and no group has claimed responsibility. The Tripoli-based government in Libya denied involvement.

Fighting restarted in August 2023. In September 2023, against the backdrop of the civil war, flooding brought by Storm Daniel caused the failure of two dams in the city of Derna, Cyrenaica, causing thousands of deaths.

On 13 August 2024 the Benghazi parliament voted to end the term of the Tripoli-based government of Prime Minister Abdul Hamid Dbeibeh, in an attempt to dissolve the Government of National Unity and proclaim the Government of National Stability as the only legitimate government of Libya. The High Council of State described the vote as void, claiming it violated the 2015 peace agreement.

On 18 August 2024, The Central Bank of Libya suspended all its operations following the kidnapping of the director of its IT department by an unknown person.

In March 2025, Libya's education minister, Moussa Al-Megarief, has been sentenced to three and a half years in prison for a textbook shortage dating back to 2021. He was accused of violating equality, favoritism in contract management, and interceding for an unnamed party regarding the printing of textbooks. The shortage forced parents to pay for photocopies of books that were supposed to be free.

In late 2024 and early 2025, various media-outlets reported a flare-up in violence near Tripoli and elsewhere, leading some to believe that a "Third Civil War" was imminent.

On 7 April 2025, the Central Bank of Libya (CBL) has decided to devalue the currency by 13.3% again after 2021, in an attempt to decrease public debt.

On 17 April 2025, the UN highlighted the lack of political unity in Libya and feared a resumption of hostilities.

On 12 May 2025, clashes erupted in the capital of Tripoli after Stability Support Apparatus (SSA) commander Abdel Ghani al-Kikli was assassinated.

Saif al-Islam Gaddafi, leader of the Popular Front for the Liberation of Libya and the son of the late Colonel Muammar Gaddafi who was considered to be his heir apparent, was assassinated on 3 February 2026.

On 14 March, a national committee was established to coordinate diplomatic efforts and security in Libya which will last until 2029 and will include representatives from the Presidential Council’s foreign affairs office, the foreign ministry, the foreign affairs committees of the House of Representatives and High Council of State, as well as the prime minister’s office. On March 15th, Mohamed al-Menfi and Musa Al-Koni met with members of the House of Representatives and High Council of State. Further rounds of discussions between the three entities are to be held with the inclusion of Libyan political parties and members of the Arab League, African Union, and ambassadors of several influential countries.

On 11 April 2026, both governments approved the first unified budget in more than a decade, as confirmed by the Central Bank of Libya.

On 15 April 2026, Exercise Flintlock, the U.S. Africa Command’s special operations exercise, took place in Libya. The training was in Sirte and involved joint forces from both eastern and western Libya training alongside international partners.

On 12 July 2026, the “Southern Liberation Operations Room”, a new, self-proclaimed rebel group, launched an attack on a Libyan National Army checkpoint near the village of Gatrun in Libya’s extreme south. A spokesperson for the LNA accused the group, which operates from northern Niger, as being funded by the Government of National Unity, an allegation which the government subsequently denied.

On 25 July 2026, protests erupted in the capital Tripoli and other major Libyan cities due to power cuts. This is due to electricity cuts and rising heatwaves in the area. The protesters have called on both governments to step down as a result of this.

Over a period of five days in August, drone strikes rocked fuel storage facilities throughout GNU-controlled Libya, including a storage tank at the Zawiya oil complex west of Tripoli that was holding 4.5 million liters of gasoline. The GNU stated that the strikes were orchestrated by the LNA’s Saddam Haftar as retaliation for Abdul Hamid Dbeibah allegedly stalling peace and merger negotiations and encouraging tribal attacks in Southern Libya. The attacks have created a roadblock for a United States-backed merger plan and the United Nations-supported democratization plan.

== See also ==
- COVID-19 pandemic in Libya
- Libyan refugees
- Turkish intervention in Libya (2020–present)
