= 2022 Tripoli clashes =

March–December 2022 conflict in the Libyan capital

- Part of the Libyan Crisis
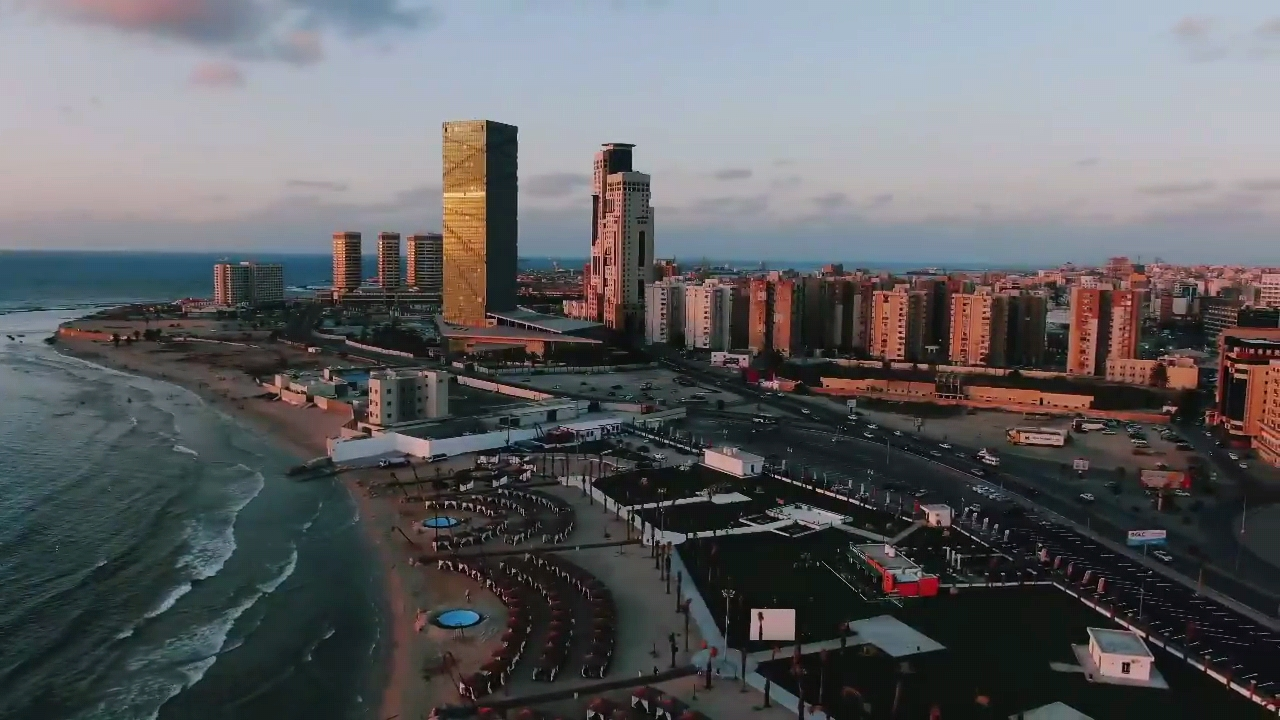
Date	March–December 2022
Location	Tripoli, Tripolitania, Libya
Result	Inconclusive

Belligerents
Government of National Stability; Libyan National Army	Government of National Unity; Syrian National Army Support: Turkey (advisers and UCAVs)

Commanders and leaders
Fathi Bashagha (GNS prime minister); Osama al-Juwaili (Zintan Brigades commander); Haitem Tajouri (28th Infantry Division/al-Nawasi Brigade & 777th Brigade commander); Muammar al-Dawi (surrendered) (55th Infantry Battalion company commander); Abu Zreba	Abdul Hamid Dbeibeh (GNU prime minister); Abdulrauf Kara (RADA commander); Emad al-Trabilisi

Units involved
28th Infantry Division (al-Nawasi Brigade); 777th Brigade; 55th Infantry Battalion; Muammar al-Dawi's company; Zintan Brigades; Remnants of the Tripoli Revolutionaries Brigade; Al-Halbous Brigade; Hittin Brigade; Al-Marsa Brigade; Abu Zreba's forces	GNA: Stability Support Authority; Special Deterrence Force (RADA); 444th Brigade; Emad al-Trabilisi's forces; 610th Brigade; 301st Battalion; 52nd Infantry Brigade; SNA: Sultan Murad Division; Sultan Suleiman Shah Division; Hamza Division

Casualties and losses
32 killed	

The 2022 Tripoli clashes erupted between forces loyal to rival Libyan prime ministers Fathi Bashagha and Abdul Hamid Dbeibeh over the capital city of Tripoli.

== Background ==
The Second Libyan Civil War ended with a ceasefire on 23 October 2020. The Government of National Unity was formed on 10 March 2021, with Abdul Hamid Dbeibeh as prime minister. The House of Representatives, based in eastern Libya, passed a motion of no confidence against the unity government on 21 September 2021, and on 10 February 2022 appointed Fathi Bashagha as prime minister, an appointment rejected by Dbeibeh and the GNU.

== Clashes ==
On 17 May, the arrival in Tripoli of parliamentary-appointed government led by Bashagha has led to several hours of fighting between armed groups. The government team had to withdraw.

On 27 August, clashes between the factions intensified after fighters aligned with Bashagha firing on a convoy in the capital and groups affiliated with Dbeibah stormed a military base belonging to a Bashagha-affiliated group. At least 32 people were killed and 159 others were injured.

From 2 to 3 September, clashes again erupted in Warshafala district on the western outskirts of Tripoli as forces aligned with the GNU under Ddeibeh further consolidated their control.

== See also ==
- 2023 Tripoli clashes
- 2025 Tripoli clashes
