= Boujenah =

Boujenah is a surname. Notable people with the surname include:

- Matthieu Boujenah (born 1976), French comedian, nephew of Michel and Paul
- Michel Boujenah (born 1952), Tunisian Jewish comedian
- Paul Boujenah (born 1958), Tunisian film director, brother of Michel
- Ramadan Boujenah, Libyan politician
