= Ali Al-Zinati =

Libyan politician

Minister of Health
- In office 15 March 2021 – 30 January 2022
- Preceded by: unknown
- Succeeded by: Ramadan Boujenah

Ali Muhammad Miftah Al-Zinati is a Libyan politician who was a minister in the Government of National Unity. He served as minister of health during the COVID-19 pandemic.
