= Hussein Al-Qatrani =

Libyan politician

Hussein Atiya Abdul Hafeez Al-Qatrani is a Libyan politician who has been the deputy prime minister for East Libya in the Government of National Unity since 15 March 2021.
