= Osama Hammad =

Libyan politician (born 1979)

- أسامة حماد

Prime Minister of Eastern Libya (Note: Government of National Stability)
- Acting
- Assumed office 16 May 2023; Disputed by Abdul Hamid Dbeibeh
- Military Leader: Khalifa Haftar
- Preceded by: Fathi Bashagha

Minister of Finance of the Government of National Stability
- Incumbent
- Assumed office 3 March 2022; Disputed by Khaled Al-Mabrouk Abdullah
- Prime Minister: Fathi Bashagha; Himself (acting)
- Preceded by: Khaled Al-Mabrouk Abdullah

Minister of Finance
- In office 13 November 2016 – 7 October 2018
- President: Fayez al-Sarraj
- Preceded by: Fakhr Mouftah Boufernah
- Succeeded by: Faraj Bou Matari

Personal details
- Born: Osama Saad Hammad Salih al-Qabaili; 1979 (age 46–47) Ajdabiya, Libya

Osama Saad Hammad Saleh (Arabic: أسامة حماد; born 1979) is a Libyan politician. On 16 May 2023, he was appointed acting prime minister of the Government of National Stability by the House of Representatives. He took over from Fathi Bashagha and was previously his finance minister.

== Political career ==
Hammad worked in the Libyan government in 2013 as head of the Atomic Energy Commission, which was part of his area of expertise, before taking over as chair of the Office of International Cooperation in the government, which at the time moved to the city of Bayda in eastern Libya after the previous National Congress (the current State Council) mandated a parallel government led by Omar al-Hassi to take control of the capital Tripoli. During that period, Libyans did not know Osama Hammad yet, but he emerged when he returned again to Tripoli after Fayez al-Sarraj, head of the Government of National Accord, which came at the time through an agreement signed by the parties to the Libyan conflict in Moroccan Skhirat under UN auspices on 17 December 2015, decided to assign him Minister of Finance. This was as of January 2016, which is the beginning of the work of the Libyan Government of National Accord, where Hammad worked alongside 17 other ministers who attended the first meeting of the then government on 2 January 2016 in Tunis, Tunisia.

After a short period of time, a political dispute arose between the House of Representatives and the government. In that dispute, Osama Hammad sided with the House of Representatives, which has the supreme legislative authority in the country. He also showed support for the Libyan National Army led by Khalifa Haftar, which was the biggest opponent of that government because of its support for the militias against the national army. That position of Minister Hammad caused Fayez al-Sarraj to dismiss him in October 2018 and appoint Faraj Boumtari, who hails from the same city (Ajdabiya), in his place. At that time, Hammad received that decision with open arms, as he issued a statement in which he said, “The job is an assignment, not an honor, as I strived hard to provide something for the country and carry out reform.” At the end of his statement, he presented “an apology to the Libyan people for any shortcoming or failure, and that he wishes success and repayment to Faraj Boumtari, the new Minister of Finance.”

In February 2022, the House of Representatives assigned Fathi Bashagha to form a new government instead of the national unity government headed by Abdul Hamid Dbeibeh, who was exempted by Parliament and still clings to power. On 1 March 2022 the House of Representatives announced, during its official session, that it gave confidence to the government of Fathi Bashagha, by a majority of 92 votes out of 101 deputies who attended the session, while Osama Hammad was among the 33 names in the new government in the position of Minister of Planning and Finance.

Given the conflict between the government appointed by the House of Representatives and the outgoing Dbeibeh government, Osama Hammad is one of the most prominent ministers defending the legitimacy of the new government.

Hammad is also considered the number one enemy of Dbeibeh's government, especially since the latter has repeatedly made statements about financial malfeasance in Bashagha's government. He also previously filed complaints with Libya's attorney general about financial corruption in Dbeibeh's government, most recently two months ago when the government in Tripoli allegedly prevented budgetary funds from being allocated to children with cancer in Benghazi, nine of whom died as a result of delayed treatment in Jordan.

Hammad himself was supervising the plan to rebuild the city of Benghazi, which was destroyed due to the war waged by the Libyan National Army against extremist organizations in the city years ago.

The House of Representatives decided on 16 May 2023 to assign Finance Minister Osama Hammad to carry out the duties of prime minister, instead of Fathi Bashagha, after about 15 months in office. According to analysts, the assignment came after the deputies criticized Bashagha's performance over the past period in all fields and made unfulfilled promises, in addition to several projects that were not completed during the specified period.

During Storm Daniel, he led the response in eastern Libya through the crisis.

== See also ==
- List of heads of government of Libya
