= Ramadan Boujenah =

Libyan politician

Minister of Health
- Incumbent
- Assumed office 30 January 2022
- Preceded by: Ali Muhammad Miftah Al-Zinati

Deputy Prime Minister of Libya
- Incumbent
- Assumed office 15 March 2021

Ramadan Ahmed Boujenah is a Libyan politician who has served as deputy Prime Minister in the Government of National Unity since 2021.

Boujenah represents the region of Fezzan in southwest Libya.
