= Fathi Bashagha =

Libyan politician (born 1962)

- Bashagha in 2020

Prime Minister of Eastern Libya (Note: Government of National Stability)
- In office 3 March 2022 – 16 May 2023; Disputed by Abdul Hamid Dbeibeh
- Leader: Khalifa Haftar
- Preceded by: Abdul Hamid Dbeibeh (Note: Government of National Unity)
- Succeeded by: Osama Hammad (a.i.)

Minister of Interior
- In office 7 October 2018 – 15 March 2021; Suspended: 28 August 2020 – 3 September 2020
- President: Fayez al-Sarraj
- Preceded by: Abdussalam Ashour
- Succeeded by: Khalid Mazen

Personal details
- Born: 20 August 1962 (age 64) Misrata, Kingdom of Libya
- Education: Air College, Misrata
- Website: fathibashagha.com

Military service
- Allegiance: Libyan Arab Jamahiriya
- Branch/service: Libyan Air Force
- Years of service: 1984–1993
- Rank: Second Lieutenant
- Commands: Air College, Misrata
- *Bashagha's premiership was disputed by Abdul Hamid Dbeibeh.

Fathi Ali Abdul Salam Bashagha (Arabic: فتحي علي عبد السلام باشآغا; born 20 August 1962), known simply as "Fathi Bashagha" or occasionally Fathi Ali Pasha, is a Libyan politician and the former interim prime minister of the rival Government of National Stability. He served as Minister of Interior from 2018 to 2021.

On 10 February 2022, Bashagha was selected as prime minister-designate by the eastern-based Libyan House of Representatives. However, GNU Prime Minister Abdul Hamid Dbeibeh rejected Bashagha's appointment as prime minister, stating that he will only hand over power after a national election. Khalifa Haftar and his Libyan National Army welcomed Bashagha's appointment.

On 16 May 2023, the Libyan eastern-based parliament suspended Bashagha and assigned his duties to the finance minister Osama Hammad.

== Early life and education ==
Bashagha was born on 20 August 1962, in the city of Misrata, Kingdom of Libya.

Bashagha was a member of the Boy Scouts of Libya.

Bashagha graduated from the Misrata aviation college in 1984 and spent a decade working as a trainer pilot specializing in fighter jets. He remained at the aviation college until he resigned from the Libyan Air Force in 1993 and started working in the import-export trade.

He is of Kouloughli-Turkish descent.

== Military career ==
After the 2011 Libyan revolution, the Judicial Committee was formed. The Judicial Committee summoned serving and resigned officers to form a military committee, the Military Council in Misrata, of which Bashagha was named a member.

Bashagha has since 2013 been involved in the Libya Dawn Operations of 2013–14, and the 2019–20 Western Libya campaign "Volcano of Anger" counteroffensive operation against the LNA Operation Flood of Dignity.

In 2011, he joined the Military Council as Head of the Information and Coordinates Department, then as spokesperson for the Misrata Military Council. He joined the advisory committee at the National Reconciliation Commission. He served as a member of the controversial Misrata Shura Council in 2012, and is considered a supporter of and involved in the Libya Dawn operations. In 2013, he ran for the post of Minister of Defence.

== Political career ==
Bashagha was elected to the House of Representatives for the city of Misrata in 2014. He decided to boycott the House of Representatives along with a group of deputies from Misrata. He was nominated in 2015 to head the Defence and National Security Council of the Al-Wefaq government and apologized for not accepting the position. In 2016, he participated in the Parliament's Political Dialogue Committee. In October 2018, the GNA government decided to assign him the duties of Minister of Interior. On 28 August 2020, Bashagha was suspended as Interior Minister amid protests in Tripoli. He was restored to his position on 3 September 2020.

Bashagha is described by journalist Fehim Tastekin as "wield[ing] influence over the Mahjoub and Halbous brigades in Misrata", being the [Muslim] Brotherhood's man" in the GNA and having "strong bonds" with the government of Turkey. Sami Zaptia, writing in the Libya Herald in September 2020, saw Bashagha's role in the GNA as being as strong as, or perhaps stronger than, that of prime minister Fayez al-Sarraj.

=== Assassination attempts ===
On 16 December 2019, Bashagha was injured after being shot at in an assassination attempt by unknown gunmen. On 21 February 2021, Bashagha survived an ambush by gunmen on his motorcade in Tripoli, in which one of his guards was wounded and the others chased the assailants, killing one of them and arresting two others.

=== Coalition with Aguila Saleh Issa ===
In the Libyan Political Dialogue Forum procedure for choosing a unified executive authority ahead of the 24 December 2021 Libyan general election, Mohamed al-Menfi ran on a joint ticket with Abdul Hamid al-Dabaib as prime minister and Musa al-Koni and Abdallah al-Lafi as members of the Presidential Council. Their list obtained 39 votes, five more than that of {head of state according to the secularist eastern government) Aguila Saleh Issa and Fathi Bashagha. The Aguila Saleh–Bashagha list was perceived to be favoured by the United States of America. The US ambassador denied any attempt to influence the electoral process.

=== Government of National Stability ===
On 10 February 2022, the House of Representatives selected Fathi Bashagha as prime minister-designate, after HoR Speaker Aguila Saleh announced that the only other candidate, Khalid Al-Baybas, withdrew his candidacy. However, Al-Baybas has denied withdrawing from the race. Prime Minister of the Government of National Unity Abdul Hamid Dbeibeh rejected Bashagha's appointment as prime minister, stating that he will only hand power after a national election. Khalifa Haftar and his Libya National Army welcomed Bashagha's appointment.

On 1 March, the House of Representatives voted to give confidence to Bashagha's Government of National Stability (GNS). According to HoR Speaker Saleh, 92 out of 101 attending members voted for the new government. The High Council of State rejected "unilateral" steps by the HoR and regards the HoR decision to grant confidence to a new government a violation of the Libyan Political Agreement. The United Nations has voiced concerns over the vote due to reports on lack of transparency and procedure, and acts of intimidation prior to the HoR session.

Bashagha and his cabinet were sworn in at the headquarters of the House of Representatives in Tobruk on 3 March.
