= House of Representatives (Libya) =

Unicameral legislature of Libya

Libyan House of Representatives مجلس النواب Majlis al-Nuwaab
- 1st Legislature

Type
- Type: Unicameral

History
- Founded: 4 August 2014; 12 years ago
- Preceded by: General National Congress

Leadership
- Speaker: Al-Salhin El-Obeidi, Independent since 6 October 2026
- First Deputy Speaker: Fawzi Al‑Nuwairi, Independent since 20 December 2017
- Second Deputy Speaker: Mesbah Doma, Independent since June 2023
- Rapporteur: Musaab al-Abed, Independent since 5 May 2019

Structure
- Seats: 200
- Political groups: After 2014 election: Independent (188); Vacant (12)

Elections
- Voting system: Parallel voting: First-past-the-post voting (40 seats); Single non-transferable vote (80 seats); Proportional representation (80 seats)
- Last election: 25 June 2014
- Next election: TBD

Meeting place
- Dar al-Salam Hotel; Tobruk, Libya; Rixos al-Nasr Hotel; Tripoli, Libya; Islamic Dawa Building, Benghazi, Libya

Website
- https://parliament.ly

Constitution
- 2011 Transitional Constitutional Declaration

The Libyan House of Representatives (HoR; Arabic: مجلس النواب, romanized: Majlis al-Nuwaab, lit. 'Council of Deputies') is the unicameral legislature of Libya, established following the 2014 parliamentary election, which recorded an 18% voter turnout.

Amid escalating conflict during the Second Libyan Civil War and the August 2014 Islamist takeover of Tripoli, the HoR relocated to the eastern city of Tobruk. Although based in Tobruk, several sessions were held in Tripoli in May 2019 while the capital was under armed assault, including the temporary appointment of an interim speaker. From 2014 to 2021, the HoR backed the Tobruk-based government led by Abdullah al-Thani. It later recognized the Government of National Unity (GNU) under Prime Minister Abdul Hamid Dbeibeh. In September 2021, the HoR passed a vote of no confidence against the GNU and subsequently appointed a rival administration, the Government of National Stability (GNS).

== History ==
=== Formation ===
The House of Representatives was officially established as Libya’s legislative body on 4 August 2014, following parliamentary elections held on 25 June 2014. It replaced the General National Congress (GNC), which had served as the interim legislature since the fall of Muammar Gaddafi’s government. Voter turnout in the 2014 election was approximately 18%, a significant decline from the 60% turnout recorded during the 2012 election. Due to security concerns, voting did not occur in several areas of the country.

At the end of its innagural session on 4 August 2014 held in Tobruk with 158 of 188 members present, Aguila Saleh Issa was elected as Speaker of the House of Representatives and sworn the next day, with Emhemed Shouaib and Hamid Houma elected to the positions of First and Second Deputy Speakers respectively.

On 6 November 2014, the Tripoli-based Supreme Judicial Council ruled that the June elections were unconstitutional and declared the HoR dissolved. The HoR rejected the ruling, claiming it had been issued under duress and that the court was under the influence of armed militias.

Subsequently, on 23 August 2014, the General National Congress was reconvened in Tripoli as a rival legislature. The House of Representatives refused to recognize the reconstituted GNC and, on 6 October 2015, voted by 112 out of 131 members to extend its own mandate beyond the original expiration date of 20 October, citing the inability to conduct new elections amid ongoing instability. By 2019, the HoR was aligned with the executive authority of the Second Al-Thani Cabinet, led by Prime Minister Abdullah al-Thani and based in the eastern city of Bayda, Jabal al Akhdar.

=== Shift to Tobruk ===
On 4 August 2014, amid escalating violence in the capital during the Second Libyan Civil War, the House of Representatives relocated to the eastern city of Tobruk in the Butnan District following the occupation of Tripoli by armed Islamist groups. Due to a shortage of available housing in Tobruk, the HoR initially chartered the Elyros, a car ferry operated by the Greek shipping company ANEK Lines, to serve as temporary accommodation and meeting space for its members.

The legislature later moved its operations to the Dar al-Salam Hotel in Tobruk, which became its formal seat.

=== Skhirat agreement ===
In October 2015, United Nations envoy Bernardino León proposed a power-sharing arrangement between the House of Representatives and the rival General National Congress, with independent Fayez al-Sarraj as a compromise candidate for prime minister. However, both parties rejected the terms of the initial proposal. Despite this, the negotiations led to a revised agreement, developed by Fayez al-Sarraj and others, which gained the support of the United Nations.

On 17 December 2015, representatives from both the House of Representatives and the reconstituted GNC signed the revised agreement, commonly referred to as the "Libyan Political Agreement" or the "Skhirat Agreement", named after the Moroccan city where the talks took place. The agreement envisioned the creation of a nine-member Presidential Council and a seventeen-member interim Government of National Accord (GNA), with the goal of organizing national elections within two years. Under the terms of the agreement, the House of Representatives would remain as the legislature, and a new consultative body, the High Council of State, would be formed with members nominated by the GNC.

On 31 December 2015, the Speaker of the House of Representatives, Aguila Saleh Issa, publicly declared his support for the agreement. As of April 2016, the Libyan National Elections Commission was still reviewing legal recommendations for conducting the next parliamentary elections.

A new round of UN-backed negotiations began in October 2017 in Tunis but ended without an agreement. On 17 December 2017, General Khalifa Haftar declared the "so-called" Skhirat Agreement void, stating it had expired and was no longer a basis for governance. On 20 December, the House of Representatives, meeting in Tobruk, elected Fawzi Al-Nuwairi, a representative from Surman in Zawiya District, as First Deputy Speaker. The election followed the resignation of Emhemed Shouaib from the position the previous week. Al-Nuwairi received 59 votes, defeating Mohamed Al-Waar, a representative from Bani Walid in Misrata District, who received 44 votes.

=== 2019 Tripoli meetings ===
In early April 2019, during the Western Libya campaign amid the Second Libyan Civil War, members of the House of Representatives publicly split in their positions on the military offensive against Tripoli. A group of 31 representatives issued a statement supporting the attack, while 49 members expressed opposition to it.

On 2 May 2019, a session of 51 HoR members was held at the Rixos al-Nasr Hotel in Tripoli. The participants emphasized that the session was not intended to divide the HoR or the country and invited other members to attend a follow-up session scheduled for 5 May. The group opposed the use of military force and called for a political resolution to the conflict. They also urged the Presidential Council, in its capacity as commander-in-chief of the armed forces, to appoint a new military chief to replace Khalifa Haftar, who had been named Supreme Commander of the Libyan National Army by the HoR on 2 March 2015.

On 5 May, a subsequent session in Tripoli saw 47 members of the HoR elect al-Sadiq al-Kehili as Interim Speaker, Musaab al-Abed as rapporteur, and Hammuda Siala as spokesperson, each for a 45-day term. The vote to appoint al-Kehili as speaker passed with 27 votes in favor. In the 2014 Libyan parliamentary election, al-Kehili was elected with 1,596 votes in Electorate 56, Tajura; Musaab al-Abed (also known as Musab Abulgasim) received 2,566 votes in Electorate 59, Hay al-Andalus; and Hammuda Siala (also spelled Sayala or Siyala) received 6,023 votes in Electorate 58, Tripoli Central.

On 8 May, another HoR session in Tripoli established several internal bodies: an Internal Code Review Committee—tasked with reviewing legislative decisions made since 2014 under Article 16 of the Skhirat Agreement; an International Communication Committee; a Secretarial Office; and a Crisis Committee to monitor the actions of the Presidential Council's emergency committee in response to the 2019 offensive. In a televised interview, spokesperson Hammuda Siala stated that resolving the Libyan crisis would require a new political agreement that reaffirmed the HoR as the country’s highest legislative authority.

==== Disappearances ====
On 17 July 2019, one of the Benghazi members of the House of Representatives, Seham Sergiwa, well-known for her documentation of rape as a weapon of war during the 2011 Libyan Civil War, was detained by the Libyan National Army (LNA). As of 20 July 2019, her location was unknown.

=== Government of National Unity ===
On 10 March 2021, the House of Representatives convened in the central city of Sirte to formally approve the formation of a Government of National Unity (GNU). The new administration was led by Mohamed al-Menfi as Chairman of the Presidential Council and Abdul Hamid Dbeibeh as Prime Minister. The formation of the GNU was approved by a vote of 121 members, with the goal of unifying the rival Government of National Accord (GNA) in Tripoli and the Second Al-Thani Cabinet based in Tobruk.

However, on 21 September 2021, the House of Representatives, meeting in Tobruk, passed a vote of no confidence against the GNU. The motion was supported by 83 of the 113 members present, effectively signaling a withdrawal of legislative support for Dbeibeh’s administration and acknowledging a shift in backing toward the rival Government of National Stability (GNS).

=== Government of National Stability ===
On 10 February 2022, the House of Representatives designated Fathi Bashagha as prime minister-designate, following the withdrawal of the only other declared candidate, Khalid Al-Baybas, as announced by Speaker Aguila Saleh Issa. The session was briefly suspended before the Speaker called for a show of hands, subsequently declaring Bashagha appointed by acclamation. However, Al-Baybas later denied having withdrawn from the race.

The appointment was rejected by the incumbent Prime Minister of the Government of National Unity (GNU), Abdul Hamid Dbeibeh, who stated he would only relinquish power following national elections. The move was supported by Khalifa Haftar and his Libyan National Army, while political and military leaders in Misrata opposed the decision and reiterated their support for the GNU. International reactions were mixed as Egypt’s Ministry of Foreign Affairs expressed support for the "new government",[5] whereas the United Nations affirmed its continued recognition of Dbeibeh’s leadership.

On 1 March 2022, the House of Representatives held a vote of confidence in support of Bashagha’s cabinet, formally establishing the Government of National Stability (GNS). According to Speaker Saleh, 92 out of 101 attending members voted in favor. However, the legitimacy of the vote was contested, with reports that 10 votes were submitted via voice messages from absent members. The High Council of State condemned what it described as "unilateral action" by the HoR, stating that the decision violated the Libyan Political Agreement. The United Nations also expressed concern over procedural irregularities, including a lack of transparency and allegations of intimidation surrounding the vote.

On 8 February 2023, the House of Representatives, meeting in Benghazi, elected Abdul Hadi Al-Saghair as Second Deputy Speaker, succeeding Hamid Houma, who had been designated by the House as Minister of Defence of the Government of National Stability and subsequently resigned from his deputy speaker role. Al-Saghair was elected with 67 votes in favor, 40 against, and 3 invalid ballots. Al-Saghair resigned from his position as Deputy Speaker on 30 May, citing “the difficulty of tackling the aspirations and hopes of the nation and its national entitlements in light of the available work tools and mechanisms.” The House later elected Mesbah Doma as his successor. On 16 May, the HoR had appointed Osama Hammad, the GNS Finance Minister, as acting Prime Minister of Libya.

On 19 May 2025, the House of Representatives convened a formal session in eastern Libya to initiate discussions on forming a new unified government, with the stated aim of preparing for long-delayed presidential and parliamentary elections. According to parliamentary spokesperson Abdullah Blehig, nominations for the post of prime minister would be accepted over a two-day period, after which candidates would present their policy programs and work plans for evaluation by lawmakers. A session to select a new prime minister was planned, with the appointee tasked with forming a government to be submitted for a vote of confidence. During the session, Speaker Aguila Saleh Issa called on the Tripoli-based Government of National Unity to step down, accusing it of using excessive force against demonstrators in the capital, and asserting that "the time has ended for this isolated government."

A coalition of lawmakers put pressure on the House of Representatives in November 2025 to remove Aguila Saleh from his position as speaker.

On 6 October 2026, an HoR session, chaired by Second Deputy Speaker Misbah Douma, was held with 102 members present, during which al-Saleheen Abdulnabi al-Obeidi was elected the new speaker. Saleh stated that the procedure was illegally invalid.

== List of Speakers ==
Image	Incumbent	Since	Until	Duration	Party
	Abu Bakr Baira (1941–2026)	4 August 2014	5 August 2014	1 day	Independent
	Aguila Saleh Issa (born 1942)	5 August 2014	6 October 2026	12 years, 62 days	Independent
	Al-Salhin El-Obeidi (born 1964)	6 October 2026	Incumbent	41 days	Independent

== See also ==
- 2014 Libyan parliamentary election – Parliamentary election in Libya
- High Council of State (Libya) – Libyan advisory body formed in 2015
- Libyan Civil War (2014–2020) – Multilateral civil war in North Africa
- Libyan Crisis (2011–present) – Conflicts in Libya since 2011
