= Abdul Hamid Dbeibeh =

Libyan politician and architect (born 1958)

His Excellency Abdul Hamid Dbeibeh
- عبد الحميد الدبيبة
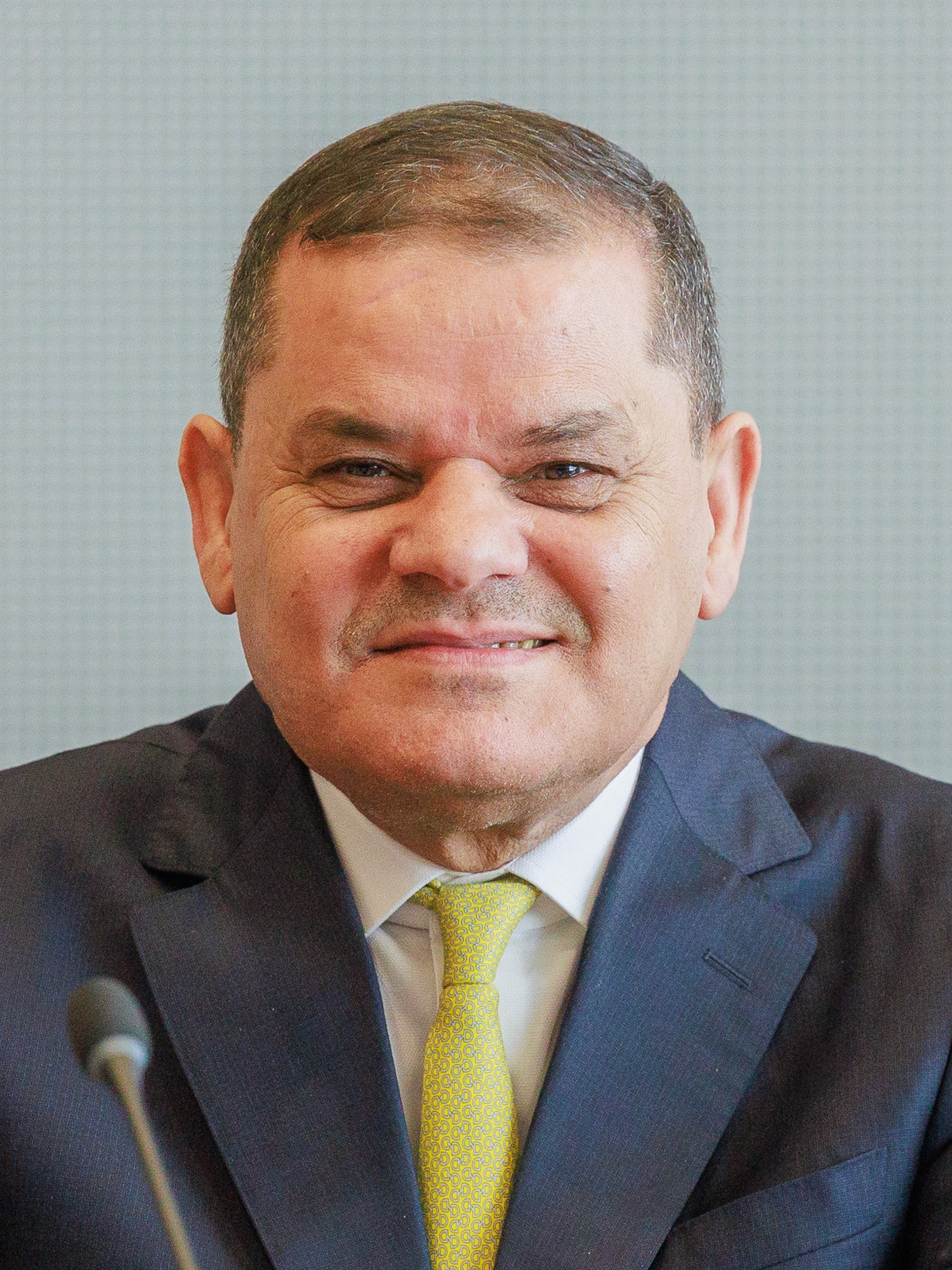
- Dbeibeh in 2024

28th Prime Minister of Libya (Note: Government of National Unity)
- Incumbent
- Assumed office 15 March 2021 (Note: Disputed with Fathi Bashagha from 3 March 2022 to 16 May 2023 and Osama Hammad since 16 May 2023, prime ministers of the Government of National Stability.)
- President: Mohamed al-Menfi
- Deputy: Hussein Al-Qatrani
- Preceded by: Fayez al-Sarraj (Note: as Chairman of the Presidential Council)

Minister of Defense
- Incumbent
- Assumed office 15 March 2021
- Prime Minister: Himself
- Preceded by: Salah Eddine al-Namroush

Minister of Foreign Affairs
- Acting
- Assumed office 3 September 2023
- Prime Minister: Himself
- Preceded by: Najla El Mangoush; Fathallah al-Zani (Acting)

Personal details
- Born: Abdul Hamid Muhammad Abdul Rahman al-Dbeibeh; 1959 (age 66–67) Misrata, Kingdom of Libya
- Party: Libya Future
- Spouse: Amina el-Shawush
- Children: 5

Abdul Hamid Muhammad Abdul Rahman al-Dbeibeh (Arabic: عبد الحميد محمد عبدالرحمن الدبيبة, also transliterated as Dbeibah; born 1959) is a Libyan politician and businessman who is the prime minister of Libya under the internationally recognised Government of National Unity (GNU) in Tripoli. Dabiba was appointed on 15 February 2021 through the Libyan Political Dialogue Forum (LPDF), and he was expected to hold the office until elections on 24 December 2021, which were later indefinitely postponed. As of October 2026, general elections still are yet to be held.

== Early life and education ==
Dbeibeh was born around 1959 in the western city of Misrata. Dbeibeh claimed to have earned a Master's degree in civil engineering from the University of Toronto in 1992; however, the university has denied Dbeibeh's claims. The information was published days prior to the 24 December 2021 Libyan elections, thus raising controversy over the Presidential candidate's claims in relation to his educational credentials. Under the Libyan electoral law, candidates are required to have a university degree from an accredited university.

== Business career ==
Dbeibeh returned to Misrata during a construction boom, gaining the trust of Libyan leader Muammar Gaddafi, who appointed him as the head of Libyan Investment and Development Company (LIDCO), a major construction firm responsible for some of the country's biggest public works projects, including the construction of 1,000 housing units in the leader's hometown of Sirte. After Gaddafi's fall in 2011, he was sanctioned for corruption by Libya's new transitional government.

Dbeibeh was head of the Al-Ittihad Football Club.

== Political career ==
=== First work ===
In 2020, he founded Libya al-Mustakbal (Libya Future) Movement. Dbeibeh campaigned jointly on the presidential ticket with Mohamed al-Menfi and Musa Al-Koni as vice president. Dbeibeh's government is the first unified government since 2014.

=== Prime Minister of Libya (2021–present) ===
Dbeibeh was elected as Prime Minister of Libya to lead a temporary unified executive in February 2021. Dbeibeh's list obtained 39 votes, five more than that of Aguila Saleh Issa and Fathi Bashagha. Dbeibeh faced accusations that he had attempted to bribe some of the delegates at the LPDF via his cousin, the wealthy businessman Ali al-Dbeibeh. The list including Aguila Saleh and Fathi Bashagha was perceived to be favoured by the United States of America. The US ambassador denied any attempt to influence the electoral process.

Dbeibeh was required under the agreements made by the LPDF to nominate a cabinet of ministers and propose the selection to the House of Representatives (HoR) for a vote of confidence by 26 February 2021, which was expected to establish the Government of National Unity.

=== Challenges to legitimacy ===
His position has been contested since 10 February 2022, after Fathi Bashagha was selected too as prime minister by the Libyan House of Representatives. However, Dbeibeh rejected Bashagha's appointment as prime minister, stating that he will only hand power after a national election. Khalifa Haftar and his Libya National Army welcomed Bashagha's appointment. On 10 February 2022, he survived an assassination attempt when assailants fired bullets into his car. According to a government source close to him, he was unharmed amid intense factional wrangling for government control. The United Nations continues to recognize Dbeibeh as interim prime minister. In January 2024, Dbeibeh called for the restoration of the Libyan monarchy under Mohammed El Senussi as a solution to the instability in the country.

== Personal life ==
He is the cousin and brother-in-law of Ali Ibrahim al-Dbeibeh, previously the mayor of Misrata and head of state-owned development contractor LIDCO during the Gaddafi era, who was in 2012 on a list of sanctioned officials, subject of an Interpol red notice and arrested in 2014. He is estimated to have embezzled as much as $7 billion at 2011 rates from contracts LIDCO had issued under his leadership, per Suisse secrets.

== Criticism ==
Wolfgang Pusztai, a former Austrian diplomat based in Libya, said that Dbeibeh's reputation was contentious for the premiership, since he was alleged to be involved in "corruption, money laundering, financing of the Muslim Brotherhood, vote buying". Pusztai felt that the truth of the claims was irrelevant to the political situation of 2021, since it was the perceptions that counted.
