= Government of National Stability =

Rival government in Libya since 2022

Government of National Stability حكومة الإستقرار الوطني
- 2022–present
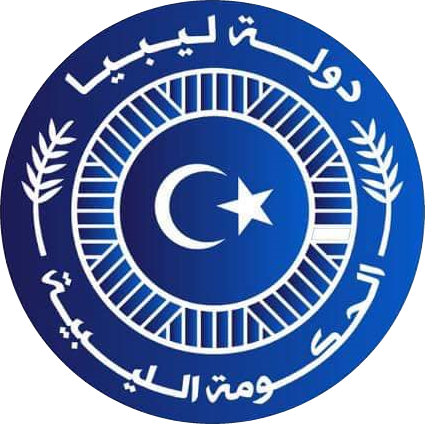
- Flag Coat of arms

- Territory controlled by the Government of National Stability is shown in red. (Note: Territory controlled by Libya’s internationally recognised government is shown in green.)
- Status: Rival government and quasi-state
- Capital: Tripoli (de jure); Benghazi (de facto)
- De facto leader of Eastern Libya
  - Since 2022: Khalifa Haftar
- Prime Minister
  - 2022–2023: Fathi Bashagha
  - Since 2023: Osama Hammad (acting)
- Chairman of the Presidential Council
  - Since 2022: Mohamed al-Menfi
- Legislature: Libyan House of Representatives
- History
  - Establishment: 3 March 2022

The Government of National Stability (Arabic: حكومة الاستقرار الوطني, romanized: Ḥukūmat al-istiqrār al-waṭanī) is a rival government and quasi-state that controls eastern Libya. It was formed on 3 March 2022, is led by Osama Hammad and supported by the House of Representatives and the Libyan National Army. Since its inception, the government has claimed power over Libya in competition with the Tripoli-based Government of National Unity led by Abdul Hamid Dbeibeh, with the Libyan Political Dialogue Forum coordinating the ceasefire agreement.

The Government of National Stability is a nominal civilian government in control of eastern Libya. However, de facto control in this area is held by the Libyan National Army and its commander Khalifa Haftar, who controls the government and the region through a military dictatorship.

As of May 2025 the United Nations recognises the Government of National Unity led by prime minister Abdul Hamid Dbeibeh as the legitimate government of Libya.

== History ==
On 21 September 2021, the House of Representatives (HoR), which controls eastern Libya, passed a no-confidence motion against the Government of National Unity.

On 10 February 2022, the House of Representatives selected Fathi Bashagha as Prime Minister-designate, after HoR Speaker Aguila Saleh Issa announced the only other candidate, Khalid Al-Baybas, withdrew his candidacy. However, Al-Baybas denied withdrawing from the race. Prime Minister of the Government of National Unity Abdul Hamid Dbeibeh rejected Bashagha's appointment as Prime Minister, stating that he will only hand over power after a national election. LNA leader Khalifa Haftar welcomed Bashagha's appointment.

On 1 March, the House of Representatives voted to give confidence to Bashagha's Government of National Stability. According to HoR Speaker Saleh, 92 out of 101 attending members voted for the new government. The High Council of State rejected "unilateral" steps by the HoR and regards the HoR decision to grant confidence to a new government a violation of the Libyan Political Agreement. The Government of National Unity refused to transfer powers to the Bashagha government. The United Nations has voiced concerns over the vote due to reports on lack of transparency and procedure, and acts of intimidation prior to the HoR session.

Bashagha and his cabinet were sworn in at the House of Representatives headquarters in Tobruk on 3 March.

In mid-2022, the two governments functioned in parallel, holding dual power.

There were clashes between supporters of the two governments starting in May 2022, which escalated on 27 August 2022.

In May 2023 Bashagha was replaced by Finance Minister Osama Hamada, citing poor performance.

A coalition of lawmakers is putting pressure on the House of Representatives in November 2025 to remove President Aguila Saleh from his position as president.

== See also ==
- Rival government
