= Government of National Unity (Libya) =

Provisional Government of Libya since March 2021

Government of National Unity حكومة الوحدة الوطنية

Overview
- Established: 15 April 2021
- Country: State of Libya
- Leader: Prime Minister of Libya
- Appointed by: Presidential Council (since 2022); House of Representatives (2021–2022)
- Main organ: Cabinet of Libya
- Headquarters: Tripoli

Territory controlled by the Government of National Unity is shown in green.

The Government of National Unity (Arabic: حكومة الوحدة الوطنية, Hukūmat al-Wahda al-Watanīya, Tedaga: agasu nduronnu numii-ĩ) is the internationally recognised government of the State of Libya formed on 10 March 2021 to unify the rival Government of National Accord based in Tripoli and the Second Al-Thani Cabinet, based in Tobruk. Abdul Hamid Dbeibeh is the Prime Minister of the unity government and was selected in the Libyan Political Dialogue Forum on 5 February 2021.

== Overview ==
Abdul Hamid Dbeibeh was selected as prime minister by the Libyan Political Dialogue Forum (LPDF), together with Mohamed al-Menfi as Chairman of the Presidential Council, and with Musa al-Koni and Abdullah al-Lafi as Presidential Council members. Dbeibeh was required under the agreements made by the LPDF to nominate a cabinet of ministers to the House of Representatives (HoR) by 26 February 2021.

On 15 February, Dbeibeh stated his intention to contact people in all 13 electoral areas of Libya for discussing proposed nominations as ministers, and for the cabinet to represent a cross-section of Libyans. The LPDF rules state that if Dbeibeh fails to present his proposed cabinet to the HoR by 26 February, or the HoR does not approve the proposed cabinet, then decision-making returns to the LPDF. Dbeibeh said the following day that he would consult with the High Council of State, the HoR and the 5+5 Libyan Joint Military Commission.

On 15 February, about 20 HoR members were present at an HoR session held in Tobruk, chaired by Aguila Saleh Issa in the "eastern" component of the HoR; 70 HoR members were present at Sabratha, the HoR session of the "western" component. The Tobruk bloc called for GNU offices to be located in Sirte and for the HoR to hold a special session for approving the proposed GNU cabinet. According to the Libya Herald, the two branches of the HoR remained in competition with one another.

On 10 March 2021, the House of Representatives met in the central city of Sirte and approved with a 121–11 vote the formation of the Government of National Unity led by Mohamed al-Menfi as chairman of the Presidential Council and Abdul Hamid Dbeibeh as prime minister.

The House of Representatives, which rules eastern Libya, passed a no-confidence motion against the unity government on 21 September 2021. On 3 March 2022 a rival Government of National Stability (GNS) was installed in Sirte, under the leadership of Prime Minister Fathi Bashagha. The decision was denounced as illegitimate by the High Council of State and condemned by the United Nations.

Both governments have been functioning simultaneously, which has led to dual power in Libya. The Libyan Political Dialogue Forum keeps corresponding with ceasefire agreement. Since May 2022, there have been clashes between supporters of the two governments in Libya, which escalated on 27 August 2022.

On 13 August 2024 the House of Representatives voted to end the term of the Tripoli-based government of Prime Minister Abdul Hamid Dbeibeh, in an attempt to dissolve the Government of National Unity and proclaim a rival Government of National Stability as the only legitimate government of Libya. However as of May 2025 the United Nations continues to recognise the Government of National Unity as the legitimate government of Libya. It is also supported by the governments of Turkey, Qatar, Algeria, Pakistan and Italy.

== Ministers ==
Abdul Hamid Dbeibeh was selected as Prime Minister of Libya in the Libyan Political Dialogue Forum on 5 February 2021 and a list of cabinet appointees was released on 11 March 2021. The Dbeibeh Cabinet replaced the rival al-Sarraj and al-Thani cabinets.

In March 2022, Minister of Civil Service, Abdul Fattah Saleh Muhammad Al-Khawja, and the Minister of State for Immigration Affairs, Ijdid Maatouk Jadeed, resigned after the House of Representatives granted confidence to and sworn-in the rival Government of National Stability led by Fathi Bashagha.

Incumbent	Office	Website	Since	Arab Name
Abdul Hamid Dbeibeh	Prime Minister of Libya	www.pm.gov.ly	15 March 2021	عبد الحميد الدبيبة
Abdul Hamid Dbeibeh	Minister of Defense	www.defense.gov.ly	15 March 2021	عبد الحميد الدبيبة
Hussein Atiya Abdul Hafeez Al-Qatrani	Deputy Prime Minister for East Libya		15 March 2021	
Ramadan Boujenah	Deputy Prime Minister for South Libya		15 March 2021	رمضان بوجناح
Ramadan Boujenah	Minister of Health		9 December 2022	رمضان بوجناح
Ali Al-Zinati	Minister of Health		15 March 2021 to 9 December 2022	
Khaled Al-Mabrouk Abdullah	Minister of Finance	www.mof.gov.ly	15 March 2021	
Najla Mangoush	Minister of Foreign Affairs	www.foreign.gov.ly	15 March 2021 to 28 August 2023	
Fathallah al-Zani	Minister of Foreign Affairs	www.foreign.gov.ly	28 August 2023 (acting)	
Fathallah al-Zani	Minister of Youth		15 March 2021	
Khaled Mazen	Minister of Interior	www.moi.gov.ly	15 March 2021 to 22 July 2022	
Bashir Al-Amin	Minister of Interior	www.moi.gov.ly	22 July 2022 to 6 November 2022 (acting)	
Emad Trabelsi	Minister of Interior	www.moi.gov.ly	6 November 2022	
Halima Ibrahim Abdel Rahman	Minister of Justice	www.aladel.gov.ly	15 March 2021	
Musa Muhammad al-Maqrif	Minister of Education	www.edu.gov.ly	15 March 2021	
Imran Muhammad Abdul Anabi Al-Qeeb	Minister of Higher Education and Scientific Research	www.edu.gov.ly	15 March 2021	
Saeed Sifaw	Minister of Technical and Vocational Education	www.edu.gov.ly	15 March 2021	
Kamel Braik Al-Hassi	Minister of Planning	www.planning.gov.ly	15 March 2021	
Wafaa Abu Bakr Muhammad al-Kilani	Minister of Social Affairs	www.socialaffairs.gov.ly	15 March 2021	
Omar Ali Al-Ajili	Minister of Economy & Trade		15 March 2021	
Ahmed Ali Muhammad Omar	Minister of Industry and Minerals	www.industry.gov.ly	15 March 2021	
Abdul Fattah Saleh Muhammad Al-Khawja	Minister of Civil Service		15 March 2021	
Badr Al-Din Al-Sadiq Al-Toumi	Minister of Local Government		15 March 2021	
Muhammad Ahmad Muhammad Aoun	Minister of Oil and Gas		15 March 2021	
Ali Al-Abed Al-Reda Abu Azoum	Minister of Labour	www.labour.gov.ly	15 March 2021	
Hamad Abdul-Razzaq Taher Al-Marimi	Minister of Agriculture		15 March 2021	
Mabrouka Othman Oki	Minister of Culture and Knowledge Development		15 March 2021	
Tariq Abdel Salam Mustafa Abu Flika	Minister of Financial Resources		15 March 2021	
Tawfiq Saeed Moftah Al-Dorsi	Minister of Livestock and Marine Resources		15 March 2021	
Abdul Shafi Hussein Muhammad Al-Juifi	Minister of Sports		15 March 2021	
Abd Al-Salam Abdullah Al-Lahi-Tiki	Minister of Tourism and Handicrafts		15 March 2021	
Ibrahim Al-Arabi Mounir	Minister of Environment		15 March 2021	
Zuhair Ahmed Mahmoud	Minister of Housing and Construction		15 March 2021	
Muhammad Salem Al-Shahoubi	Minister of Transportation		15 March 2021	
Houria Khalifa Miloud	Minister of State for Women's Affairs		15 March 2021	
Salama Ibrahim Al-Ghwail	Minister of State for Economic Affairs		15 March 2021	
Ahmed Faraj Mahjoub Abu Khuzam	Minister of State for Displaced Affairs and Human Rights		15 March 2021	
Walid Ammar Muhammad Ammar Al-Lafi	Minister of State for Communication and Political Affairs		15 March 2021	
Ijdid Maatouk Jadeed	Minister of State for Immigration Affairs		15 March 2021	
Adel Jumaa Amer	Minister of State for Prime Minister and Cabinet Affairs		15 March 2021	
