= Storm Daniel =

2023 storm in the Mediterranean Sea

Tropical Storm Daniel
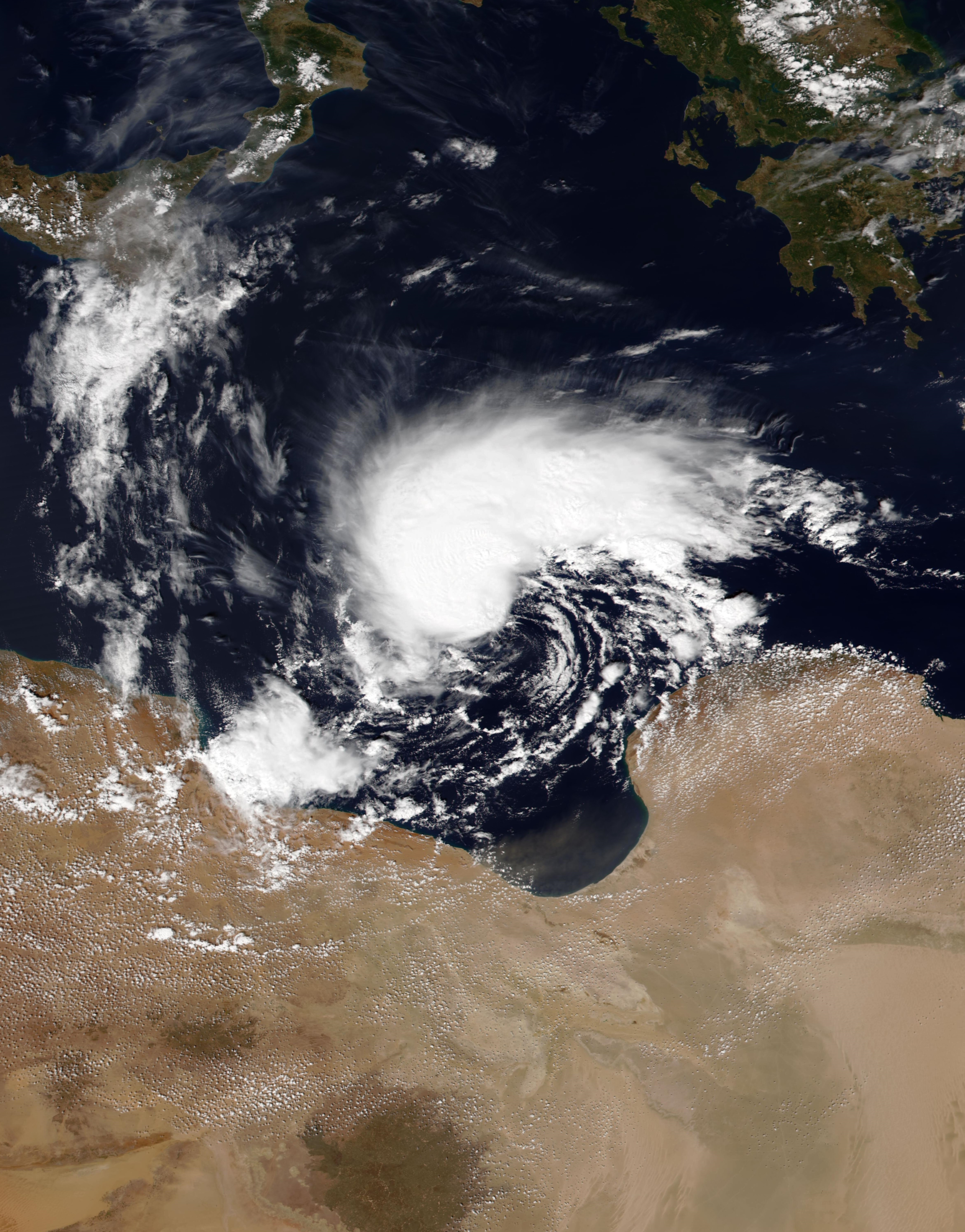
- Storm Daniel near peak intensity prior to landfall on 9 September 2023

Meteorological history
- Formed: 4 September 2023
- Remnant low: 11 September 2023
- Dissipated: 12 September 2023

Tropical storm
- 1-minute sustained (SSHWS)
- Highest winds: 95 km/h (60 mph)
- Lowest pressure: 996 hPa (mbar); 29.41 inHg

Tropical storm
- 10-minute sustained (EUMETSAT)
- Highest winds: 90 km/h (55 mph)

Overall effects
- Fatalities: 5,951+ (confirmed)
- Injuries: 7,031+
- Missing: 8,000+
- Damage: >€19.9 billion (US$21.14 billion in 2023)
- Areas affected: Bulgaria; Egypt; Syria; Greece; Israel; Libya; Turkey
- Part of the 2022–23 European windstorm season (Note: The season traditionally ends on 31 August 2023. Storm Daniel, which was named on 4 September 2023, was still included.)

Storm Daniel, also known as Medicane Daniel or Cyclone Daniel, was a relatively weak yet catastrophic and erratic tropical cyclone that became the deadliest Mediterranean tropical-like cyclone in recorded history, as well as the second-costliest tropical cyclone on record outside of the North Atlantic Basin (after Typhoon Doksuri). Forming as a low-pressure system around 4 September 2023, the storm affected Greece, Bulgaria, and Turkey with extensive flooding. The storm then organized as a Mediterranean low and was designated as Storm Daniel. It soon acquired quasi-tropical characteristics and moved toward the coast of Libya, where it caused catastrophic flooding caused by the collapse of two dams, Derna and Mansour, resulting in the flooding of the Wadi Derna river causing great damage to the city of Derna. After collapsing the two dams, Storm Daniel degenerated into a remnant low. The storm was the result of an omega block; a high-pressure zone sandwiched between two zones of low pressure, with the isobars shaping like the Greek letter omega (Ω).

In Greece, severe rainfall led to flooding that caused more than two billion euros in damage, making it the most costly recorded storm for the country. Libya was hit the hardest, with torrential rains causing two dams near the city of Derna to fail. This resulted in over 5,900 deaths and 7,000 injuries, with at least 8,000 others missing. Libya's vulnerability to such disasters was blamed on its civil war, which damaged critical infrastructure and left it in poor condition before the storm. In the aftermath, several countries along the Mediterranean Sea pledged to provide aid to affected countries.

== Meteorological history ==
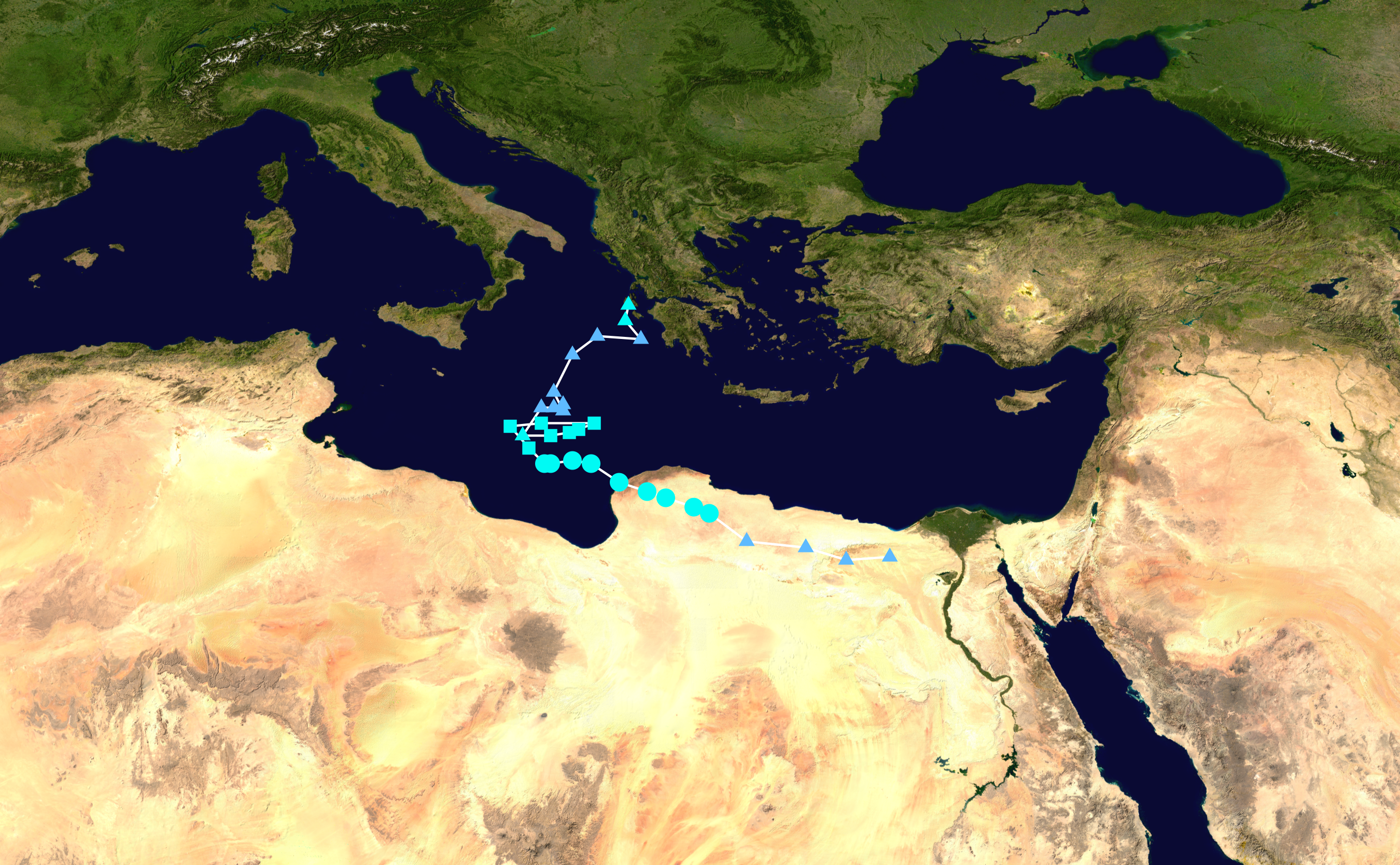
Map plotting the storm's track and intensity, according to the Saffir–Simpson scale Map key Saffir–Simpson scale Tropical depression (≤38 mph, ≤62 km/h) Tropical storm (39–73 mph, 63–118 km/h) Category 1 (74–95 mph, 119–153 km/h) Category 2 (96–110 mph, 154–177 km/h) Category 3 (111–129 mph, 178–208 km/h) Category 4 (130–156 mph, 209–251 km/h) Category 5 (≥157 mph, ≥252 km/h) Unknown Storm type Tropical cyclone Subtropical cyclone Extratropical cyclone, remnant low, tropical disturbance, or monsoon depression

An area of low pressure developed over the Ionian Sea with its surface temperature within the range of tropical transition. On 4 September 2023, it moved inland over the Balkan Peninsula which led to torrential rains, notably over the Thessaly region. The system became a Mediterranean cyclone the following day, and was named Storm Daniel by the Hellenic National Meteorological Service. Daniel transitioned into a Mediterranean tropical-like cyclone on 9 September. During the following days, the system moved southeastward, peaking as a tropical storm with winds recorded by instruments on Metop at 45 knots (83 km/h; 52 mph).

The storm made landfall near the city of Benghazi in Libya on 10 September. Daniel went east and continued inland before degenerating into a low pressure-area later on, with the storm dissipating by 12 September. Climate warming may also have influenced mid-latitude atmospheric blocking in the summer, which resulted in Storm Daniel and another cold-core low that caused flooding in Spain.

== Impact ==
Fatalities from Storm Daniel
Country	Deaths	Damage USD
Greece	17	$2.14 billion
Turkey	7	—N/a
Bulgaria	4	—N/a
Libya	5,923+	$19 billion

Storm Daniel was regarded by researchers from Yale University as the deadliest single flood event to hit Africa in recorded history, with its death toll surpassing flooding in Algeria that killed 3,000 in 1927. It was also regarded as the deadliest storm globally since at least Typhoon Haiyan in 2013.

=== Greece ===
On 5 September, flooding in Thessaly, Greece, killed at least one person. On the same day, the village of Zagora received 759 millimetres (29.9 in) of rain, 55 times more than the country's average rainfall for the same month. Portaria also recorded a new rainfall record of 884 mm (34.8 in). Further rainfall could not be measured because the weather station subsequently failed. On 6 September, the Krafsidonas river, which rises at Pelion, overflowed its banks in Volos and destroyed a bridge and a nursing home, while dragging cars, buses, trees, and other debris along its path.

On 7 September, the main motorway between Athens and Thessaloniki was closed and train services between the two cities were suspended. In Thessaly, over 800 people had to be rescued amidst collapsed buildings and bridges and submerged villages. In Larissa, after the rains ended on 8 September, water continued to rise as the Pineios river overflowed its banks to reach a level of 9.5 metres (31 ft), compared to the normal level of 4 m (13 ft). In the Vale of Tempe, the water level rose to about 18 m (59 ft), reaching the level of a suspension bridge.

Storm Daniel turned many villages in the low-lying area of Karditsa, in the mainland Thessaly plain, into a lake. Towns and villages affected were Palamas, Proastio, Agia Triada, Megala Kalyvia and Kalogriana that were blocked from water.

One man died in Volos when a wall collapsed on him, and in the nearby Pelion area the body of an old lady was discovered on 6 September while four people were reported missing. At least six villages in and around the Pelion mountain range suffered huge damage.

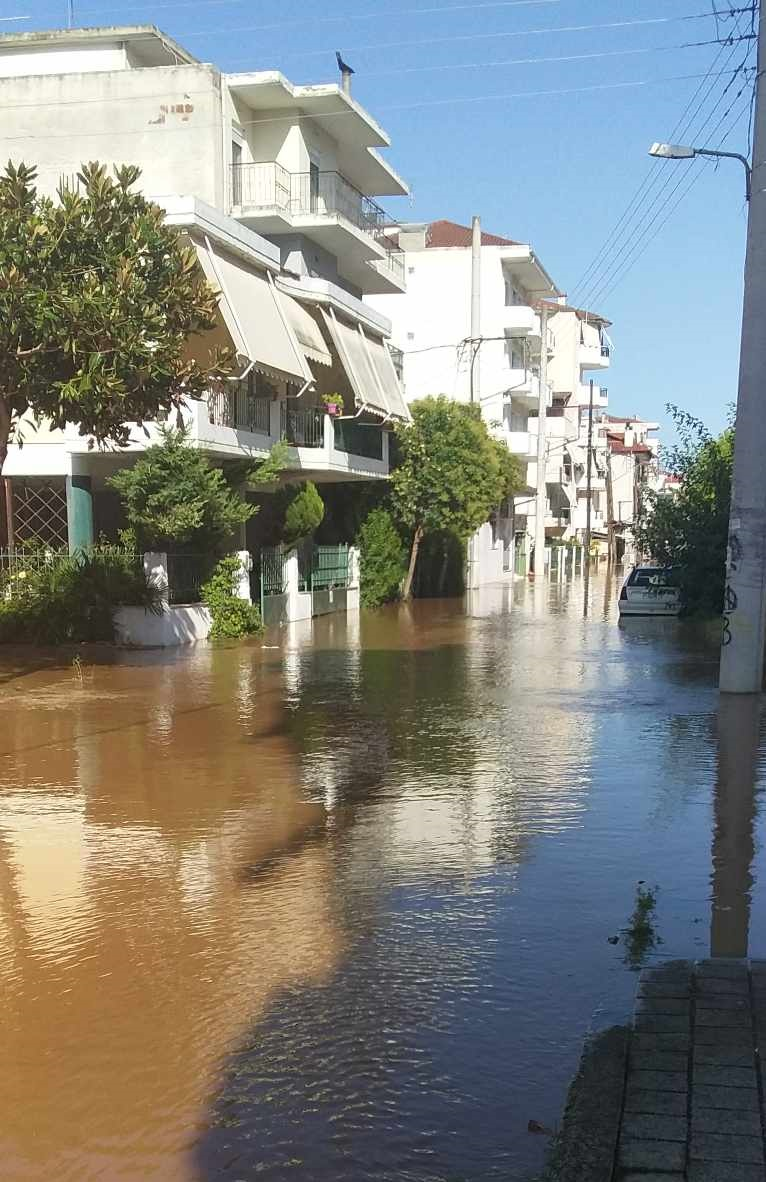
A flooded street in Larissa, Greece

Since the rainfall started, the Copernicus Programme's Rapid Mapping Service was activated for the flood zone in Greece, in which analysis of the Sentinel-1 data from 7 September revealed an estimated flood area of around 73,000 hectares (180,000 acres). Meteorologists classified the storm as Greece's worst since records began in 1930. The floods in Thessaly, which supplies about 15% of Greece's agricultural production, destroyed the crops for the remainder of the year and caused serious long-term damage as the thick layer of mud made the soil infertile, taking up to five years to become fully functional again. The governor of Thessaly, Kostas Agorastos, told the Hellenic Broadcasting Corporation (ERT) that the storm damage in the region was calculated to be more than €2 billion. By 16 September, the death toll in the country had risen to seventeen. Among those killed were an Austrian couple who were trapped in a holiday home that was washed away by floods in Potistika, near Pelion, on 6 September.

Police banned travel to Volos, certain Pelion villages and the nearby island of Skiathos. Authorities also sent text alerts to inhabitants in other areas of central Greece, on the Sporades islands and on the island of Evia near Athens, warning them to limit their movements outdoors, since flooding was forecast to continue until at least the afternoon of 7 September.

Later that month, the Deputy Climate Crisis and Civil Protection, Evangelos Tournas, reported to the Hellenic Parliament that 110,000 animals were found dead and 135,000 poultry were registered as lost across Thessaly.

=== Turkey ===
During the initial days of the storm, five people were killed in Turkey during floods in İğneada, Kırklareli Province. The deaths happened in the vicinity of İğneada Floodplain Forests National Park in an unlicensed bungalow establishment. Rising waters carried logs from a nearby forestry business and the logs dragged the houses along with them, destroying the buildings and killing the people in the process.

On 6 September, the districts of Ikitelli, Arnavutköy, Başakşehir and Küçükçekmece in Istanbul were flooded due to heavy rainfall. Two died in Başakşehir and Küçükçekmece, with 31 others injured. The victims were a Guinean citizen who was trapped inside his basement apartment in Küçükçekmece, the other was a woman who died after being swept away by the floods in Küçükçekmece. More than 1,750 homes and businesses in the city were affected. The governor of Istanbul, Davut Gül, said the city received rainfall roughly equivalent to what it would expect in the entirety of September in the space of six hours. He also said on social media that authorities would provide accommodation and safety for those affected by flooding.

=== Bulgaria ===
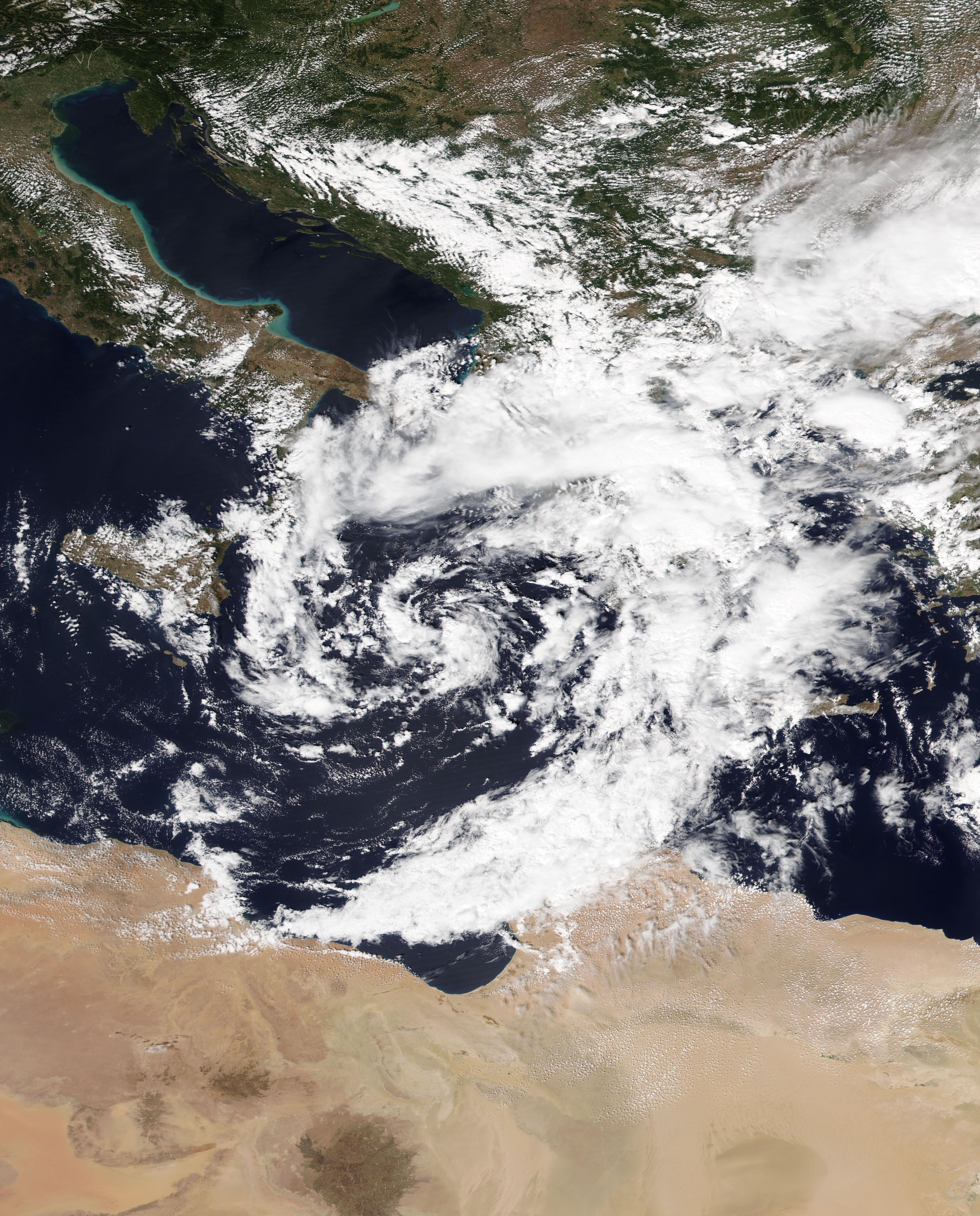
Storm Daniel on 5 September 2023

Villages on and near the Black Sea coast in Burgas Province, including Kosti and Arapya, became submerged, forcing evacuations. Three people were swept away after a bridge collapsed in the Tsarevo area, and another person drowned near the town.

Rainfall in Kosti was measured at 311 millimetres (12.2 in) (420% of the monthly average for September), in Ahtopol it amounted to 196 millimetres (7.7 in) (350% of the monthly average), and in Gramatikovo to 275 millimetres (10.8 in) (368% of the monthly average). In Tsarevo, rainfall was expected to set a national record, with 330 millimetres (13 in) of precipitation within 20 hours (40% of the annual average). Flooding in the town prompted authorities to declare a state of emergency.

A rare waterspout of approximately 80 metres (260 ft) was observed in the sea near Tyulenovo in the northeast of the country.

The whole southern region of Bulgaria's Black Sea coast was affected by the disaster. Most of the rivers in the region burst their banks and several bridges were destroyed, causing serious transporting and rescue problems to over 4,000 inhabitants and tourists, according to tourism minister Zaritsa Dinkova.

=== Libya ===
==== Preparations ====
Osama Hamada, Prime Minister of the Government of National Stability, which controls eastern Libya, declared a state of emergency on 9 September and suspended classes as a precaution. The National Oil Corporation also announced a three-day closure of four oil ports including Ras Lanuf, Zueitina, Brega, and Sidra. The facilities in Ras Lanuf, Brega, and Sidra reopened on 12 September, while the port of Zueitina reopened on 13 September.

==== Derna dam failures ====
In Libya, at least 5,923 people were killed, mostly in and around the city of Derna after the Derna (also known as Belad) and Mansour (or Abu Mansour) dams collapsed, releasing an estimated 30 million cubic metres (39 million cubic yards) of water, and causing catastrophic damage across the area after the Wadi Derna overflowed its banks by 50 metres (160 ft) on each side. 30,000 residents were displaced.

Prior to the storm, residents were prevented from leaving their homes after authorities imposed a precautionary curfew at 10:00 PM on 10 September. Residents recalled hearing loud explosions at the time the dams burst, with video showing the flood reaching Derna shortly before 03:00 EET on 11 September. Prime Minister Hamada stated that residential neighborhoods were swept away. Videos posted to social media showed cars being submerged in the deluge. Four bridges also collapsed, while Hamada's aviation minister Hisham Chkiouat said that Derna looked as if it had been hit by a "tsunami". He also said that 25% of the city had "disappeared", with large parts of the city dragged out to the Mediterranean Sea.

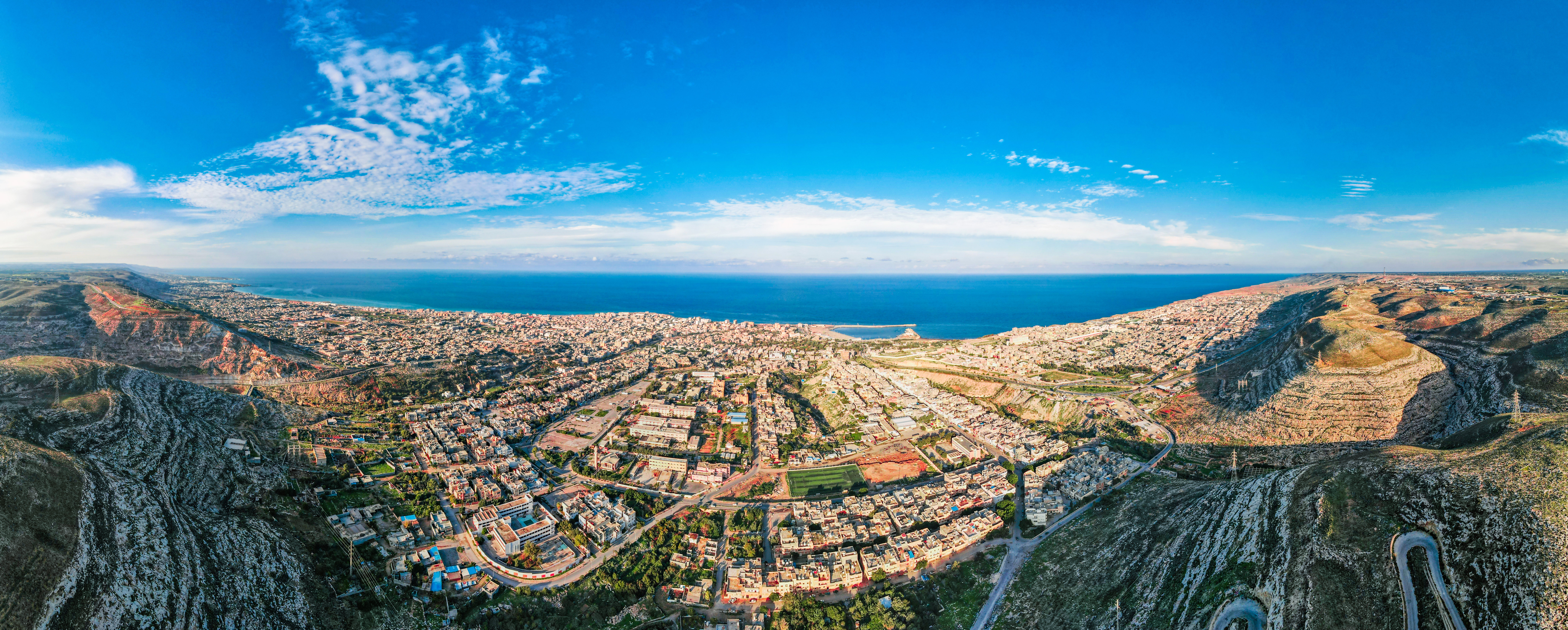
View of Derna in December 2020, the second dam is visible on the far centre-left.

Hamada's health minister, Othman Abduljalil, said 6,000 people were missing in Derna alone. The mayor of Derna, Abdulmenam Al-Ghaithi, told al-Arabiya that the final death toll in the city could range from 18,000 to 20,000, equivalent to a fifth of the city's population. In September 2024, Libya analyst Anas El Gomati suggested a death toll of between 14,000 and 24,000. Only three of the city's ten districts escaped the flooding, while five out of seven entry routes into Derna were rendered inaccessible. The collapse of bridges along the Wadi Derna effectively split the city into two. Officials said that of the 6,142 buildings in Derna, a total of 1,500 suffered damage, of which 891 were completely destroyed, 211 partially destroyed, and the remaining 398 were submerged in mud. An estimated six square-kilometres (2.3-square-mile) of land in the city was inundated.

Hospitals in the city were rendered inoperable while morgues filled up, prompting bodies to be laid out on sidewalks and in the city's main square. More than 300 bodies were sent to a morgue in Tobruk to cope with the overcrowding. More than 1,000 bodies were later buried in mass graves. Naval teams were dispatched to recover bodies swept out to sea by the floods. Over the succeeding days, at least 200 bodies were found washed up as far as 20 kilometres from Derna. Others were found more than 100 kilometers (62 miles) from the city. Dozens of victims were found trapped in their cars at sea. One survivor was rescued after being found 11 nautical miles (about ~20 kilometres) off the coast of Derna.

The scale of the disaster in Derna was attributed to decades of neglect of the region by the regime of Muammar Gaddafi, followed by the city becoming a battleground during the civil war and concurrent NATO intervention in the 2010s and its resulting political effects that included the establishment of rival governments in the west and east of the country respectively. After Gaddafi's overthrow, the city changed hands four times. The collapsed dams were built by Yugoslav company Hidrotehnika-Hidroenergetika from 1973 to 1977 to control flooding, irrigate agricultural lands and provide water to nearby communities. They were described as clay-filled embankment dams with a height of 75 metres and 45 metres respectively.

The Mansour (or Abu Mansour) dam had a water storage capacity of 1.5 million cubic metres, while the Derna (or Belad) dam upstream had a capacity of 22.5 million cubic metres (1.5 million cubic metres by another source).

Floods in Libya, most of the additional rainfall from the storm fell outside Wadi Derna's basin

The two dams sustained major damage in a storm in 1986, and cracks were reported in both structures in 1998. Derna's deputy mayor said that the dams had not been maintained since 2002 and were not built to withstand such volumes of water. The lack of maintenance occurred despite the allocation of more than 2 million euros for that purpose in 2012 and 2013. However, a Turkish construction firm called Arsel Construction Company Limited claimed that it had been contracted to do maintenance work on the dam and build another one in 2007, saying that it had completed its tasks in 2012. Libyan officials repudiated the claims, saying that the company stopped work following the outbreak of the civil war in 2011.

As recently as 2022, a researcher at the Omar Al-Mukhtar University in Bayda, Libya, had warned in a paper that the dams needed urgent attention, pointing out that there was "a high potential for flood risk". The paper also called officials to urgently carry out maintenance on the dams, prophetically stating that “(in) a huge flood, the results will be catastrophic”. The Wadi Derna had been known to be prone to flooding, having experienced four major floods between 1942 and 2011. It is believed that the collapse of the Derna dam, located at the convergence of two river valleys, led to waters rushing 12 kilometres (seven miles) towards the sea and overwhelming the Mansur dam, which was already under stress from rising water levels in its reservoir, along the way. Representatives of the Red Cross said that the dams' failure produced waves with a height of seven metres (23 ft).

==== Other countries ====
About 170 millimetres (6.7 in) of rain fell in Al Abraq. Witnesses told Reuters that floodwaters rose as high as 3.0 metres (10 ft). Flooding also occurred in Tobruk, Tacnis, Al-Bayada, Battah, Qandulah, and Mechili as well as throughout the Jabal al Akhdar district and in Misrata to the west. In Al-Wardiya, at least 20 of the village's 50 houses were washed out by the floods. At least 27 people were reported killed and many more were missing. There were 19 deaths reported in Susa, seven in the towns of Omar al-Mokhtar and Shahhat, and one in Marj. Eight people were reported to have died in Alfaydia. In Bayda, hospitals were evacuated due to significant flooding brought by Daniel. 200 people were killed, and dozens were missing. About 414 millimetres of rain fell in the city, equivalent to 77% of its average annual total. Around 5,000 homes, 35 kilometres of roads and 20 kilometres of drainage lines in the city suffered damage. In Marawa, around 60 farms were destroyed.

Damage was also reported in archaeological sites across eastern Libya. Several structures and in situ artifacts at the ruins of Cyrene were buried in mud or swept downstream into the Mansura region. The floods also revealed previously unexcavated portions and artifacts at the site. The International Crisis Group warned that the site was at risk of collapse, citing the erosion of the site's outer walls and drainage channels and contaminated wastewater flowing through the ruins. Damage was also reported in the archaeological sites of Apollonia and Athrun, with some artifacts reportedly washed out to sea.

==== Nationwide impact ====
The disaster was seen as the worst to hit the Cyrenaica region since the 1963 Marj earthquake. Conflicting figures emerged regarding the number of casualties. As of 26 September 2023, at least 4,199 people are known to have died from the storm in Libya according to Libyan authorities, with at least 170 deaths reported outside Derna, while Libyan authorities say between 10,000 and 100,000 others are missing, including seven members of the Libyan National Army. Prior to that, it was initially reported that more than 11,000 people had died according the United Nations, which in turn based its figures from the Libyan Red Crescent. However, the latter agency rejected the claims, saying that official numbers were released by Libyan authorities. About 7,000 people were reportedly injured and 46,000 were displaced, including more than 16,000 children. 117 schools were also affected, with four schools being totally destroyed and 80 others suffering partial damage. Ten hospitals and 20 other medical facilities were forced out of service by the storm. Three volunteers of the Libyan Red Crescent were killed while responding to the floods. Field Marshal Khalifa Haftar, the de facto ruler of eastern Libya, called the damage "huge" and "hard to describe or measure".

The Libyan Football Federation confirmed the deaths of four players in its leagues, namely Shaheen Al-Jamil, a member of Premier League club Al Tahaddi based in Benghazi, Monder Sadaqa, from Premier-League club Darnes based in Derna, and brothers Saleh and Ayoub Sasi, who were members of Darnes' youth team. A fifth player, Ibrahim Al-Qaziri of Second Division club Nusour Martouba, was also reported by the BBC to have been killed. Derna Stadium also suffered severe damage from the floods.

More than 400 foreign nationals were killed during the floods, including at least 276 migrants from Sudan, A member of the Sudanese community in Derna said that 700 Sudanese families in the city had been displaced by the floods. 145 Egyptian citizens, seventy-five of whom were from the village of Al-Sharif in Beni Suef, and 23 Palestinians. The Syrian Observatory for Human Rights estimated that at least 42 Syrians also died in the storm, adding that the total number of deaths could reach 150.

The World Meteorological Organization said that the casualties caused by the floods could have been prevented had a functional weather service been in place in Libya and that satellite earth observations have provided a better response to monitoring soil erosion that increased flow destructive power.

The United Nations' aid chief Martin Griffiths said on 14 September that an estimated 884,000 people in the country were in need of assistance, while almost 300,000 children were at risk of exposure to post-flood diseases, violence and exploitation.

The Libyan Post Telecommunications and Information Technology Company said that the storm cut off the submarine internet cable linking Libya to Europe, "completely" destroying the country's international communications gateway. Libya's Roads and Bridges Authority assessed that 70% of civilian infrastructure in the affected areas was destroyed by the storm, with 80% of the water system going out of service and 50% of all roads impassable, while a total of 11 bridges collapsed.

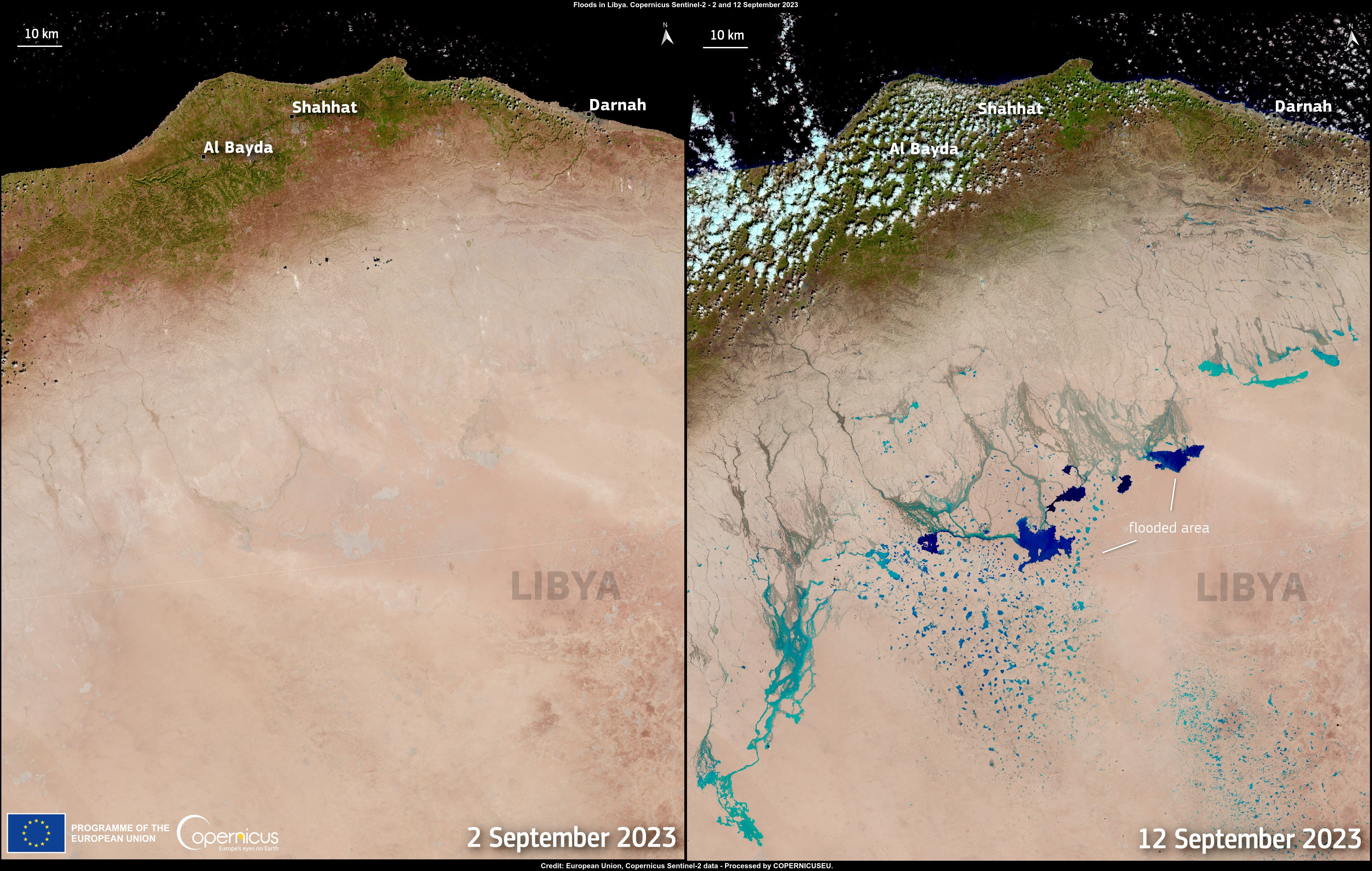
Satellite images of Libya from September 2023

=== Egypt ===
Daniel reached Egypt on 11 September, where parts of the northwestern region of the country experienced moderate rainfall.

As Daniel's remnants reached the Nile Delta and Cairo, residents across the country reported an unusual odor on 12 September. Manar Ghanem, a representative from the media center of the Egyptian Meteorological Authority, refuted any connection between the phenomenon and Daniel, but noted that the storm had caused dust, rain and weather fluctuations.

=== Israel ===
The remnants of Daniel reached Israel on 13 September, causing unusually heavy localized rains. Minor property damage and a number of sinkholes were reported but without injuries.

== Aftermath ==
=== Libya ===
Political map of Libya (June 2020)

==== Domestic reactions ====
The Libyan Presidential Council based in Tripoli declared the cities of Derna, Shahhat, and Bayda disaster zones, while the Tripoli-based Health Ministry dispatched a plane carrying 14 tons of medical equipment, drugs, body bags, and personnel to Benghazi on 12 September. The House of Representatives (HoR) based in Benghazi, which controls most of the areas affected, declared three days of national mourning, as did the internationally recognized Government of National Unity (GNU) based in Tripoli led by Prime Minister Abdulhamid al-Dbeibah. Dbeibah pledged an investigation over the extensive damage, as well as the allotment of 2.5 billion Libyan dinars ($515 million) to help rebuild Derna and Benghazi, while the House of Representatives unveiled a nearly $2-billion budget for relief efforts. Dbeibah also announced the establishment of a meticulous evaluation process for foreign aid, saying that they would "only accept aid that is deemed necessary."

On 14 September, Dbeibah took responsibility for the collapse of the dam and the failure to enact its maintenance. On 15 September, Libyan General Prosecutor al-Sediq al-Sour (HoR) announced that he would open an investigation into the disaster in Derna. Abdulmenam Al-Ghaithi was suspended from his post as mayor of Derna, while the entire city council was dismissed and subjected to investigation on orders of Prime Minister Hamada. Serour later ordered the arrest of Ghaithi, two members of the Derna city council and 17 officials responsible for water resources and dam management on suspicion of "bad management" and negligence.

Television channels across the country carried a joint broadcast for the first time to collect donations. Ordinary Libyans also responded to calls for help on social media, with individuals as far away as Zawiya, in GNU-controlled territory west of Tripoli, volunteering to go to Derna to assist in relief efforts.

The United Nations noted that the rival governments had been coordinating with each other regarding the relief efforts. On 13 September, a GNU ministerial delegation left Tripoli to assess the damage in Derna. At the same time, reports emerged of the Libyan National Army – commanded by Khalifa Haftar – preventing journalists from entering the city and confiscating their phones. Haftar himself promised promotions to soldiers who participated in the relief efforts. The first relief convoys arrived in Derna late on 12 September. On 14 September, the port of Derna was reopened to vessels with a minimum draft level of 6.5 metres delivering humanitarian aid, while electricity was restored to the western part of the city. On the same day, the Libyan Ambulance and Emergency Service announced that remaining residents of Derna were to be evacuated and the city closed except for search-and-rescue teams. On 18 September, the GNU announced the beginning of construction of a temporary bridge across the Wadi Derna. The HoR-led administration announced that an international conference would be held in Derna on 1–2 November to discuss plans for its reconstruction. It also announced the establishment of a fund for the reconstruction of Derna and a compensation scheme for those displaced, with residents whose homes were destroyed receiving 100,000 dinars ($20,500), those with partially destroyed homes receiving 50,000 dinars, and those who lost furniture or household appliances receiving 20,000 dinars.

On 13 September, evacuations were advised by authorities for the town of Tocra, west of Derna, after they warned that a dam in the area was at risk of collapse.

The Libyan disease control agency reported on 15 September that at least 150 people had contracted diarrhoea in Derna after drinking contaminated water, prompting the agency to ban affected residents from utilizing local water sources. Authorities subsequently divided Derna into four sections to create buffers in case of a disease outbreak. The HoR's Health Ministry announced the beginning of a vaccination campaign in Derna prioritizing children, rescue workers, and medical personnel. On 19 September, nearly 60 local recovery workers were hospitalized due to diarrhoea and vomiting.

On 17 September, a bus carrying a Greek humanitarian aid team to Derna collided with a car carrying a Libyan family east of Benghazi. Three Hellenic Army personnel and two Greek Foreign Ministry translators in the bus, and three passengers of the other car were killed. Two other occupants of the car and eight bus passengers were injured.

On 18 September, residents of Derna protested outside the city's Al Sahaba Mosque and denounced the HoR and its speaker, Aguila Saleh. Some of the demonstrators later set fire to Mayor Ghaithi's residence. The protesters also called for the downfall of the HoR, the establishment of a United Nations office in the city, and an investigation of the city council and past budgets. In response, the Government of National Stability ordered the expulsion of all journalists from Derna for allegedly hampering rescue efforts and prevented a United Nations team from entering the city. Internet and telephone access was cut for 36 hours, which the state telecommunications company said was caused by the severing of fiber-optic cables due to possible sabotage. Around a dozen people were arrested, according to Libyan National Army officials.

==== International reactions ====
Tunisia, Germany, Qatar, Iran, Malta, Turkey, and the United Arab Emirates pledged humanitarian assistance to Libya, while Egyptian President Abdel Fattah el-Sisi said that he would deploy the country's military in coordination with eastern Libyan forces to help in relief operations. He also declared three days of national mourning for the victims of the floods as well as those of the 2023 Moroccan earthquake on 8 September. A military delegation led by armed forces chief of staff Osama Askar went to eastern Libya on 12 September to meet with Khalifa Haftar. The delegation included 25 rescue teams and three military aircraft carrying humanitarian supplies. The bodies of 84 Egyptians who were killed in Derna were repatriated from Tobruk and buried on 13 September. Following a request from the president of the Libyan Presidential Council, Mohamed al-Menfi, Algeria sent eight Ilyushin Il-76 aircraft carrying humanitarian aid that included food supplies, medical equipment, clothing, and tents.

On 12 September, Italy activated its civil protection departments, with Foreign Minister Antonio Tajani stating an assessment team was on their way, with the naval vessel San Marco arriving in the port of Derna on 16 September carrying two search and rescue helicopters, 100 tents, 5,000 blankets, sanitary equipment, eight water pumps and engineering equipment. The Italian government extended its state of “intervention for overseas emergency” for six months and allocated five million euros to support relief operations in eastern Libya. Anne-Claire Legendre, a spokesperson for France's foreign ministry, announced that the country was ready to respond to requests made by Libya's government. EU foreign policy chief Josep Borrell said the organization was on stand-by to bring support, while the commission's president Ursula von der Leyen expressed condolences. Member states Germany, Romania and Finland subsequently sent aid. The World Health Organization sent a shipment consisting of 40 tons of aid to Libya. The United Nations allocated $10 million for disaster relief. The European Union also pledged to provide €2 billion to Greece in the aftermath of the natural disasters, expected to be used for reconstruction efforts and restoration of the affected areas.

Libyan club Al-Ahly Benghazi asked the Confederation of African Football (CAF) to postpone its upcoming African Champions League match scheduled on 17 September against Ivoirian side ASEC Mimosas. Al-Hilal Benghazi also asked the CAF to postpone its upcoming African Confederation Cup match scheduled on 15 September against Rwandan side Rayon Sport, citing the "unsuitable" situation created by the floods. The CAF subsequently moved Al-Ahly's match to 18 September and that of Al-Hilal to 23 September. It also announced a moment of silence for the victims of the storm, as well as that of the 2023 Moroccan earthquake for succeeding matches.

=== Economic effects ===
The disruption of oil exports from Libya due to the storm contributed to the price of Brent Crude rising to $92.38 per barrel on 12 September, the highest price recorded since November 2022.

In Greece, the effects of Storm Daniel, combined with the country's worst wildfires earlier in the summer, prompted Prime Minister Kyriakos Mitsotakis to pledge a 10 percent rebate on property tax for homeowners insuring their property against natural disasters and consider making calamity insurance compulsory.

=== Effects on migration ===
In the week following the storm, more than 120 boats carrying around 7,000 migrants and refugees from Africa arrived on the Italian island of Lampedusa within 24 hours, increasing the volume handled by the local migration reception center by 15 times and leading to the migrants outnumbering the island's native population. The increase was partly attributed to Storm Daniel, as people-smugglers paused operations for several days during its onslaught, thus creating a bottleneck for those stuck in North African countries such as Tunisia.

== See also ==
- Weather of 2023
- Tropical cyclones in 2023
- Cyclone Numa (2017) – a medicane which also caused widespread damage in Greece.
- Cyclone Ianos (2020) – a strong medicane which also severely affected Greece.
- Cyclone Apollo (2021) – a medicane which also affected North Africa after impacting Southern Europe.
- Cyclone Samuel (2026) – a rare March medicane that affected similar areas in North Africa
- List of deadliest floods
- List of natural disasters by death toll

Other disasters which occurred around the same time as Daniel

- 2023 Marrakesh–Safi earthquake
- 2023 Greece wildfires
- 2023 North Africa wildfires
- Storm Elias, which also affected Greece later that month.
