= Derna dam collapses =

Failure of two dams in Libya

- Date: 10–11 September 2023
- Location: Wadi Derna, Derna District, Libya
- Cause: Storm Daniel, engineering flaws, policy errors, possible damage from past military clashes, global warming
- Deaths: 4,540 (official government figures)
- Missing: 3,297 (official government figures)
- Property damage: Two dams collapsed, thousands of properties destroyed

The Derna dam collapses were the catastrophic failures of two dams in Derna, Libya, on the night of 10–11 September 2023, in the aftermath of Storm Daniel. The collapse of the Abu Mansour Dam and the Derna Dam released an estimated 30 million cubic meters (39 million cubic yards) of water, causing flooding downstream as the Wadi Derna overflowed its banks. The floods partially destroyed the city of Derna. The official death and missing persons toll was over 7,800 according to government figures, however, unofficial estimates of the death toll and missing were higher. The event was the second-deadliest dam failure in history, after the 1975 Banqiao Dam failure in China.

== Background ==
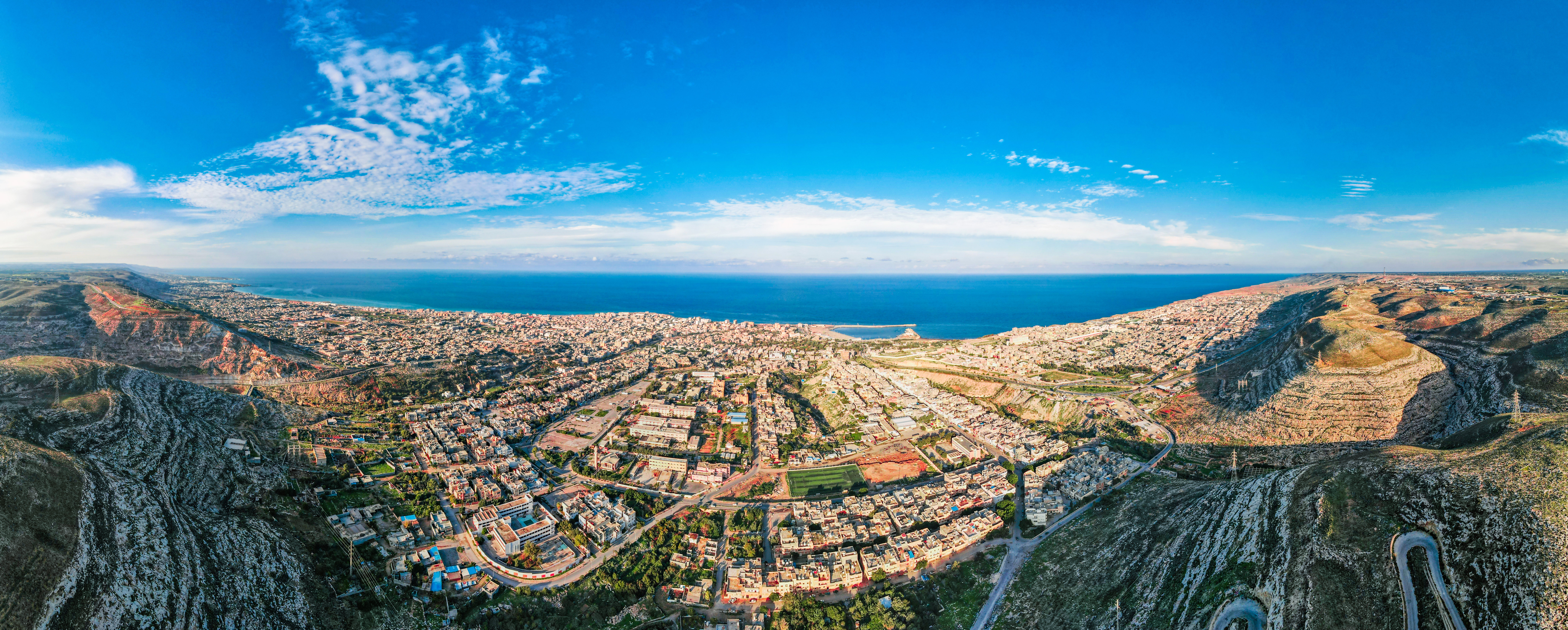
View of Derna in December 2020, the second dam is visible on the far centre-left.

=== Dam construction ===
The collapsed dams were built under Muammar Gaddafi's government by Yugoslav company Hidrotehnika-Hidroenergetika in the 1970s to control flooding, irrigate agricultural lands and provide water to nearby communities. They were described as clay-filled embankment dams with a height of 75 meters (Mansour dam) and 45 meters (Derna dam). The Derna (or Belad) dam) dam had a water storage capacity of 1.5 million cubic meters, while the Mansour (or Abu Mansour) dam upstream had a capacity of 22.5 million cubic meters. (Note: In contradiction to these references (AP News, hindustantimes, and engineering.com), the graphics in File:ECDM 20230915 FL Libya.pdf and File:ECDM 20230913 FL Libya.pdf both specifically name Monsur as downstream from the Derna Dam; the France24 reference "Libya’s deadly dam..." (2023-09-13) and the hidrotehnika reference also have Mansour smaller and downstream (tho' the latter also describes the 'Derna-Bou Mansur road' as 24 km long, implicitly contradicting its table entries); however, consistently with the refs, at Maps.google.com the 'Wadi Abu Mansour Dam' is shown upstream, visibly larger, and the 'Al-Balad Dam' (described as a weir) downstream and smaller, and OpenStreetMap and MapCarta also show Abu Mansour some miles upstream; the 2024 report by Ashoor and Eladawy also states that the Bou Mansour dam was 15.6km up the wadi.)

Questions have been raised regarding the spillways of the dams in Derna; both operated using the 'Bell-mouth spillway' design. (Note: A spillway is a waterway used to dispose of excess flood water from a reservoir after it has been filled to capacity. Spillways are provided for all dams and serve as dam safety valves. A spillway can be located within the dam's body, at the dam's end, or totally separate from the dam as an independent structure. It is critical to provide a sufficient capacity spillway. On the other hand, a spillway with insufficient capacity may cause dam overtopping, resulting in serious and permanent damage to the dam or the dam's failure. It is possible that the cause of failure is overtopping followed by scour. This happens when the spillway is too small (the inflow rate too large) for the spillway to pass the inflow downstream without the water level rising higher and overflowing the dam itself.)

==== Locations ====
- Abu Mansour Dam – 32°39′34″N 22°34′38″E
- Derna (or Belad) Dam – 32°45′11″N 22°37′53″E
- Derna City – 32°45′49″N 22°38′10″E

=== Political situation ===
The scale of the disaster in Derna was attributed to decades of neglect of the region by and following the rule of Muammar Gaddafi. Throughout the 2010s the city was a battleground, during the Libyan civil war, concurrent NATO intervention, and conflicts between rival governments established after Gaddafi's overthrow. After Gaddafi was overthrown, the city changed hands four times.

=== Warnings ===
Cracks had been reported in the dams as early as 1998. Derna's deputy mayor said that the dams had not been maintained since 2002 and were not built to withstand such volumes of water. According to a state-run audit agency, the lack of maintenance occurred despite the government's allocation of more than €2 million for that purpose in 2012 and 2013. However, a Turkish construction firm called Arsel Construction Company Limited claimed that it had been contracted to do maintenance work on the dam and build another one in 2007, and stated on its website that it completed that work in 2012.

As recently as 2022, a researcher at the Omar Al-Mukhtar University in Bayda, Libya had warned in a paper that the dams needed urgent attention, pointing out that there was "a high potential for flood risk". The paper also called officials to urgently carry out maintenance on the dams, prophetically stating that "(in) a huge flood, the results will be catastrophic". The Wadi Derna had been known to be prone to flooding, having experienced four major floods in 1942, 1959, 1968 and 1986.

=== Storm Daniel ===
Immediately before the dam failures, Storm Daniel caused extreme rainfall across northeastern Libya. Between 4 and 10 September 2023, the storm caused torrential rain in Greece and the Balkans, intensified into a Mediterranean cyclone, and moved south across the Mediterranean. On 10 September the storm made landfall in Libya near the city of Benghazi. Twenty-four-hour rainfall totals of 150–240 mm were recorded across northeastern Libya, and winds reached 70–80 mph. Daniel moved east and continued inland before degenerating into a low pressure-area, and the storm dissipated by 12 September.

== Collapse ==
Prior to the storm, residents were prevented from leaving their homes after authorities imposed a precautionary curfew on 10 September 2023.

It is believed that the Mansour dam, located at the convergence of two river valleys, was the first of the two dams to collapse. The released waters rushed 12 kilometers (7.5 miles) towards the sea and overwhelmed the Derna (or Belad) dam, which was already under stress from rising water levels in its reservoir. Residents recalled hearing loud explosions at the time the dams burst.

These waters swept through Derna with video showing the flood reaching the city shortly before 03:00 EET (UTC+2:00) on 11 September. Videos posted to social media showed cars being submerged in the deluge. Prime Minister Osama Hamada stated that residential neighborhoods were swept away, while Hamada's aviation minister Hisham Chkiouat said that Derna looked as if it had been hit by a "tsunami". He also said that 25% of the city had "disappeared", with large parts of the city dragged out to the Mediterranean Sea.

Hospitals in the city were rendered inoperable while morgues filled up, prompting bodies to be laid out on sidewalks and in the city's main square. More than 300 bodies were sent to a morgue in Tobruk to cope with the overcrowding. More than 1,000 bodies were later buried in mass graves. Naval teams were dispatched to recover bodies swept out to sea by the floods. Over the succeeding days, at least 200 bodies were found washed up as far as 20 kilometers from Derna. Others were found more than 100 kilometers (62 miles) from the city. One person was rescued after being found 11 nautical miles off the coast of Derna.

== Damage and casualties ==
Floods in Libya, most of the additional rainfall from the storm fell outside Wadi Derna's basin.

Initial estimates of casualties from the disaster varied widely. The UN Office for the Coordination of Humanitarian Affairs gave an estimate of 11,300 dead, but later withdrew that number. Othman Abduljalil, the health minister of Libya's Government of National Stability at the time, said 6,000 people were missing in Derna alone. The mayor of Derna, Abdulmenam Al-Ghaithi, told al-Arabiya that the final death toll in the city could range from 18,000 to 20,000, equivalent to a fifth of the city's population. Libyan analyst Anas El Gomati said in a September 2024 report by Al-Monitor that a death toll of 14,000 to 24,000 was more probable.

Only three of the city's ten districts escaped the flooding, while five out of seven entry routes into Derna were rendered inaccessible. The collapse of four bridges along the Wadi Derna effectively split the city into two. An analysis by the United Nations showed that more than 2,200 buildings in the city were flooded. Over 40,000 people were 'displaced'.

== Aftermath ==
Protesters called for officials in Libya's eastern government to be sacked for failing to maintain the dam or issue an evacuation order. On 18 September, the home of Derna's mayor Abdulmenam al-Ghaithi was burnt down. On 25 September, al-Ghaithi and several other officials were detained over mismanagement and negligence accusations following the dam collapse.

On 28 July 2024, 12 officials responsible for managing water resources and maintaining the dams received jail sentences.

== Reactions ==
=== Domestic ===
The Libyan Presidential Council based in Tripoli declared the cities of Derna, Shahhat, and Bayda disaster zones, while the Tripoli-based Health Ministry dispatched a plane carrying 14 tons of medical equipment, drugs, body bags, and personnel to Benghazi on 12 September. The House of Representatives (HoR) based in Benghazi, which controls most of the areas affected, declared three days of national mourning, as did the internationally recognized Government of National Unity (GNU) based in Tripoli led by Prime Minister Abdulhamid al-Dbeibah. Dbeibah pledged an investigation over the extensive damage, as well as the allotment of 2.5 billion Libyan dinars ($515 million) to help rebuild Derna and Benghazi, while the House of Representatives unveiled a nearly $2 billion budget for relief efforts. Dbeibah also announced the establishment of a meticulous evaluation process for foreign aid, saying that they would "only accept aid that is deemed necessary." On 14 September, Dbeibah took responsibility for the collapse of the dam and the failure to enact its maintenance. On 15 September, Libyan General Prosecutor al-Sediq al-Sour announced that he would open an investigation into the disaster in Derna. Ordinary Libyans also responded to calls for help on social media, with individuals as far away as Zawiya, in GNU-controlled territory west of Tripoli, volunteering to go to Derna to assist in relief efforts.

The first relief convoys arrived in Derna late on 12 September.

The United Nations noted that the rival governments had been coordinating with each other regarding the relief efforts. On 13 September, a GNU ministerial delegation left Tripoli to assess the damage in Derna. At the same time, reports emerged of the Libyan National Army—commanded by Khalifa Haftar—preventing journalists from entering the city and confiscating their phones. Haftar himself promised promotions to soldiers who participated in the relief efforts.

On 13 September, evacuations were advised by authorities for the town of Tocra, west of Derna, after they warned that a dam in the area was at risk of collapse.

On 14 September, the port of Derna was reopened to vessels with a draft of no more than 6.5 meters delivering humanitarian aid, while electricity was restored to the western part of the city. On the same day, the Libyan Ambulance and Emergency Service announced that remaining residents of Derna were to be evacuated and the city closed except for search-and-rescue teams. The Libyan disease control agency reported on 15 September that at least 150 people had contracted diarrhea in Derna after drinking contaminated water.

=== International ===
Egyptian President Abdel Fattah el-Sisi said that he would deploy the country's military in coordination with eastern Libyan forces to help in relief operations. He also declared three days of national mourning for the victims of the floods as well as those of the 2023 Moroccan earthquake on 8 September. A military delegation led by armed forces chief of staff Osama Askar went to eastern Libya on 12 September to meet with Khalifa Haftar. The delegation included 25 rescue teams and three military aircraft carrying humanitarian supplies. The bodies of 84 Egyptians who were killed in Derna were repatriated from Tobruk and buried on 13 September.

Following a request from the chairman of the Libyan Presidential Council, Mohamed al-Menfi, Algeria sent eight Ilyushin Il-76 aircraft carrying humanitarian aid that included food supplies, medical equipment, clothing, and tents.

On 12 September, Italy activated its civil protection departments, with Foreign Minister Antonio Tajani stating an assessment team was on their way. Anne-Claire Legendre, a spokesperson for France's foreign ministry, announced that the country was ready to respond to requests made by Libya's government. EU foreign policy chief Josep Borrell said the organization was on stand-by to bring support, while the commission's president Ursula von der Leyen expressed condolences. Member states Germany, Romania and Finland subsequently sent aid. The World Health Organization sent a shipment consisting of 40 tons of aid to Libya. The United Nations allocated $10 million for disaster relief.

Tunisia, Germany, Qatar, Iran, Malta, Turkey, and the United Arab Emirates additionally pledged humanitarian assistance to Libya.

In the weeks following the disaster, journalists from around the world reported great difficulty getting into the city, being turned away at airports or needing authorization to enter. Many rescue workers were similarly restricted.

The dam failures heightened awareness of the risk of dam collapses around the world. Specific attention was given to Mullaperiyar Dam in India, which was at risk of failure.
