= Derna waterfalls =

Waterfall near Deena, Libya

Coordinates: 32°43′5″N 22°36′53″E

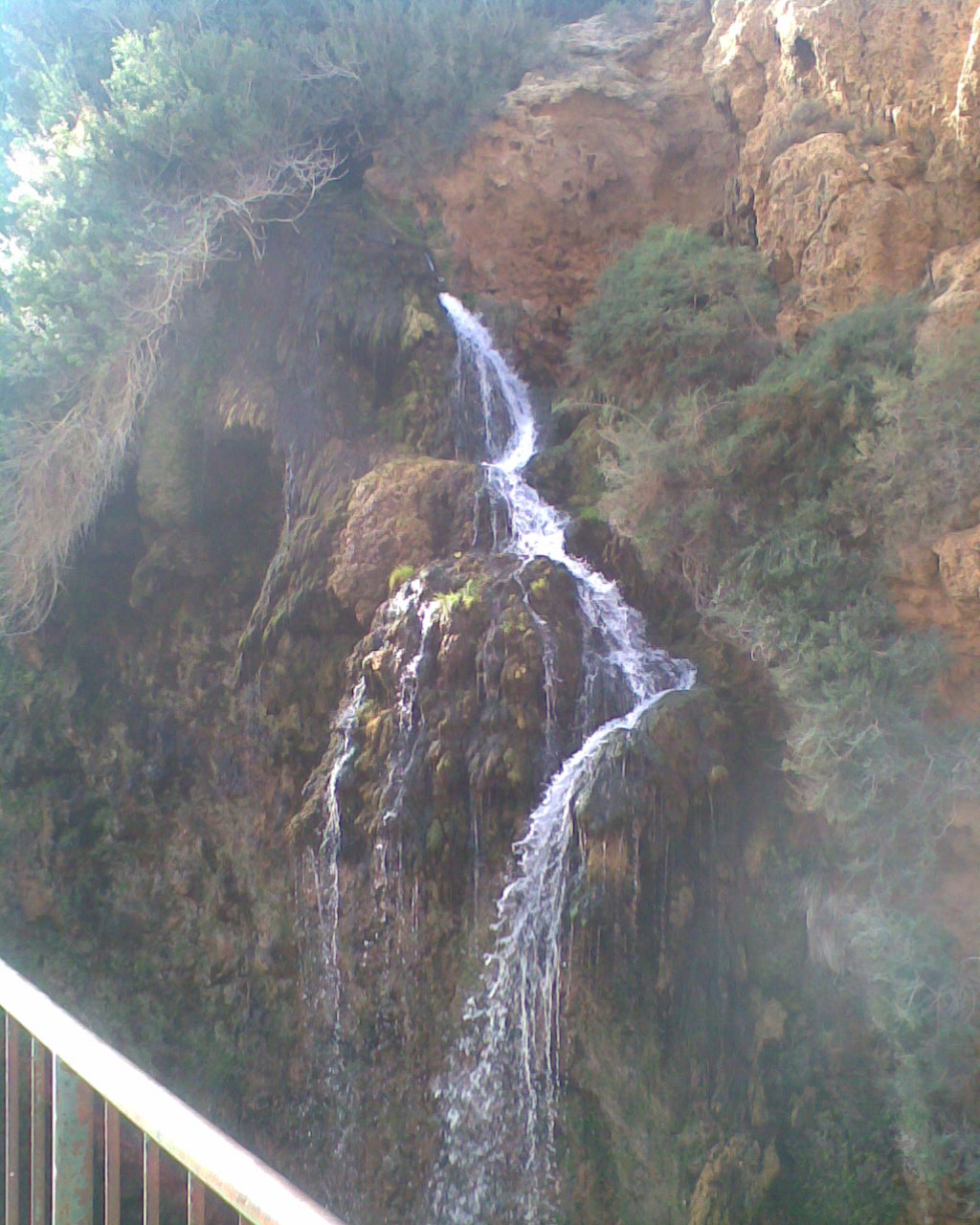
Derna waterfalls

Derna waterfalls (Arabic: شلال درنة) is a fresh-water waterfall in the Jebel Akhdar Mountains, south of the city of Derna, in the northern Cyrenaica region of eastern Libya.

The falls have a drop of about 20 metres (70 feet). They are located approximately 7 km (4.3 mi) from central Derna, in the Derna District. They are located on a right bank seasonal tributary at its confluence with the Wadi Derna.

== See also ==
- List of waterfalls
