= Arapya =

Bulgarian resort

Coordinates: 42°11′27″N 27°50′08″E

Arapya Арапя
- resort
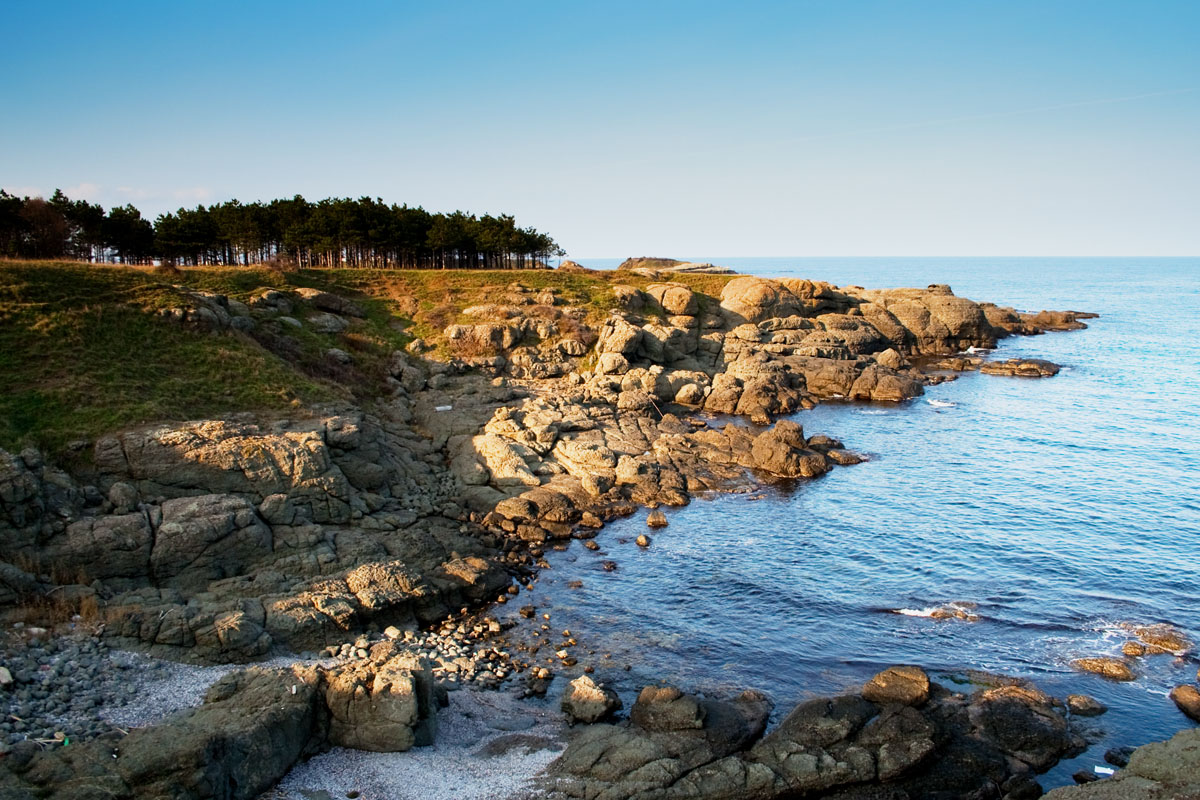
- Arapya
- Interactive map of Arapya
- Province: Burgas Province

Arapya (Bulgarian: Арапя) is a beach resort area in the Burgas Province of Bulgaria, located just north of the town of Tsarevo.

== History ==
In September 2023, Storm Daniel caused floods to submerge the village and tourists to be evacuated.

== See also ==
- List of villages in Burgas Province
