= 2023 North Africa wildfires =

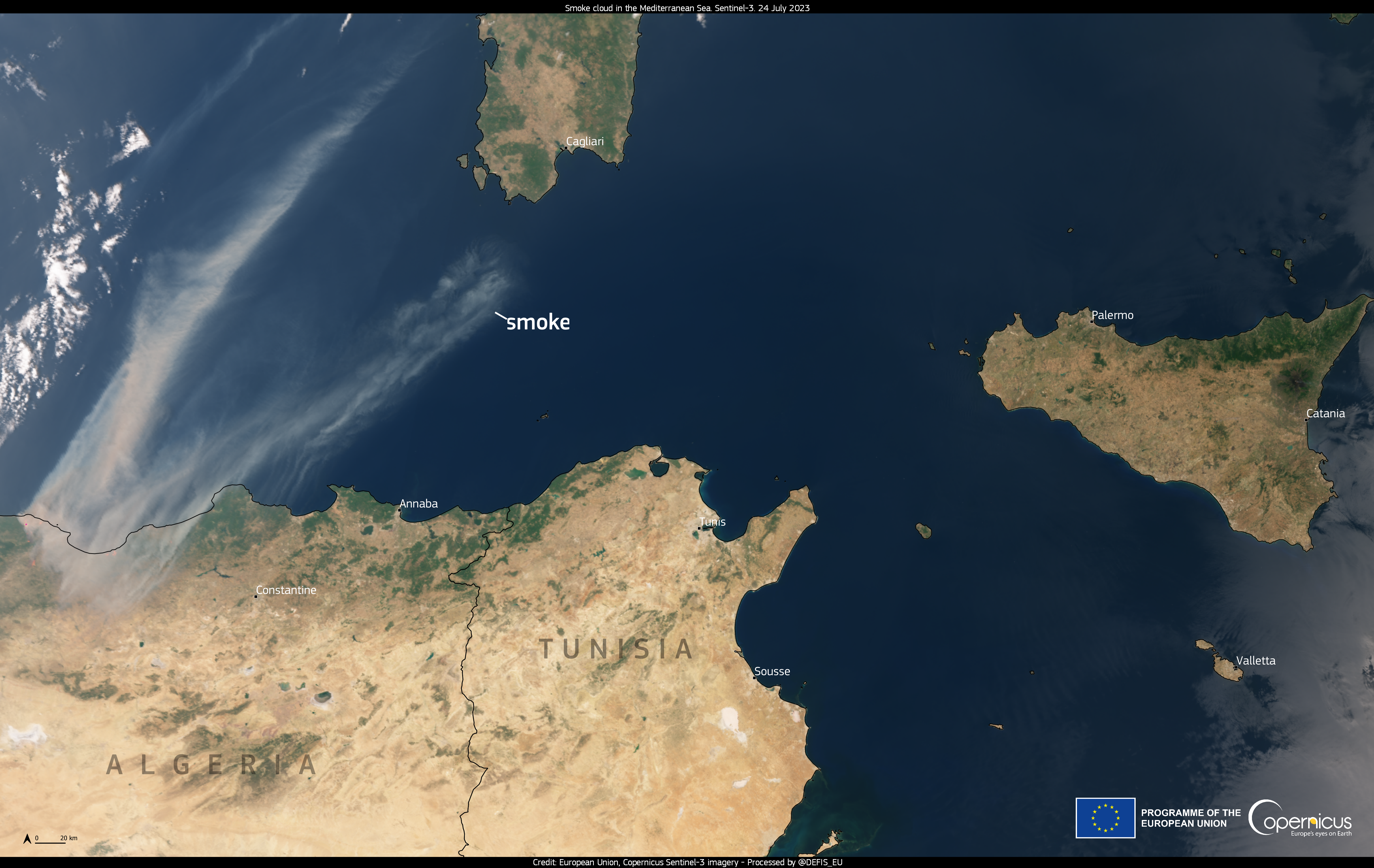
- Date: 24 July 2023
- Location: Bejaia, Tabarka Bouira and Jijel, Algeria; Melloula and Nefza, Tunisia; Tanger-Tetouan-Al Hoceima, Morocco

Statistics
- Total fires: 97+

Impacts
- Deaths: 34
- Injuries: 26+
- Structures destroyed: Hotels, houses and villages burned

Ignition
- Cause: European heatwaves in 2023

The North Africa wildfires started on 24 July 2023 primarily in Algeria with at least 97 blazes, killing at least 34 (with 10 soldiers), injuring 26, mobilising 7,500 firefighters and 350 firetrucks with aerial support, forcing thousands of evacuations primarily in El Taref Province with blazes also reported in Tunisia and Morocco.

== See also ==
- List of wildfires
- 2009 Mediterranean wildfires
- 2022 European and Mediterranean wildfires

=== Other 2023 disasters in the Maghreb ===
- 2023 Marrakesh–Safi earthquake
- Storm Daniel
