= Wadi Derna =

Ephemeral river bed in Libya

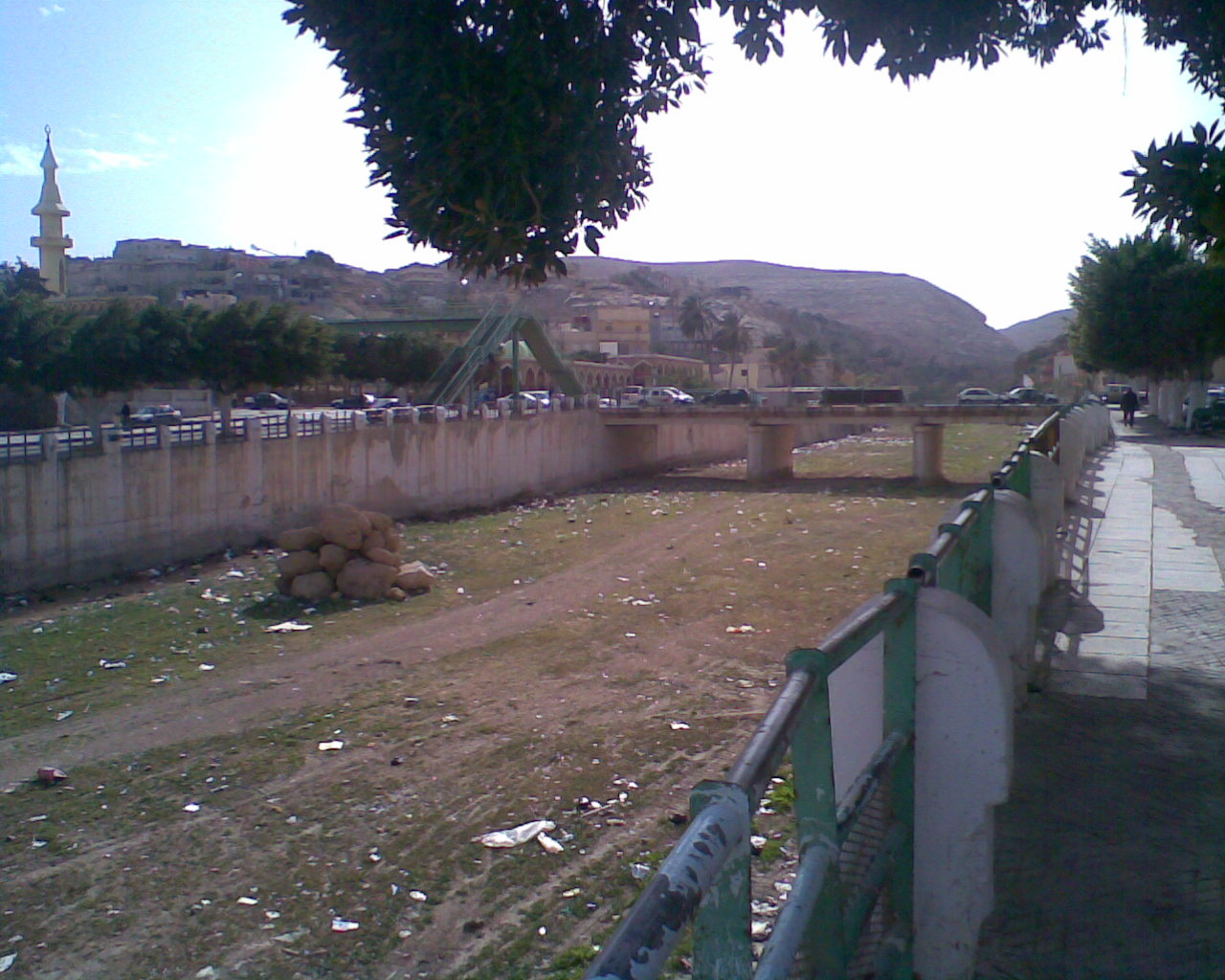
- Wadi Derna, January 2010

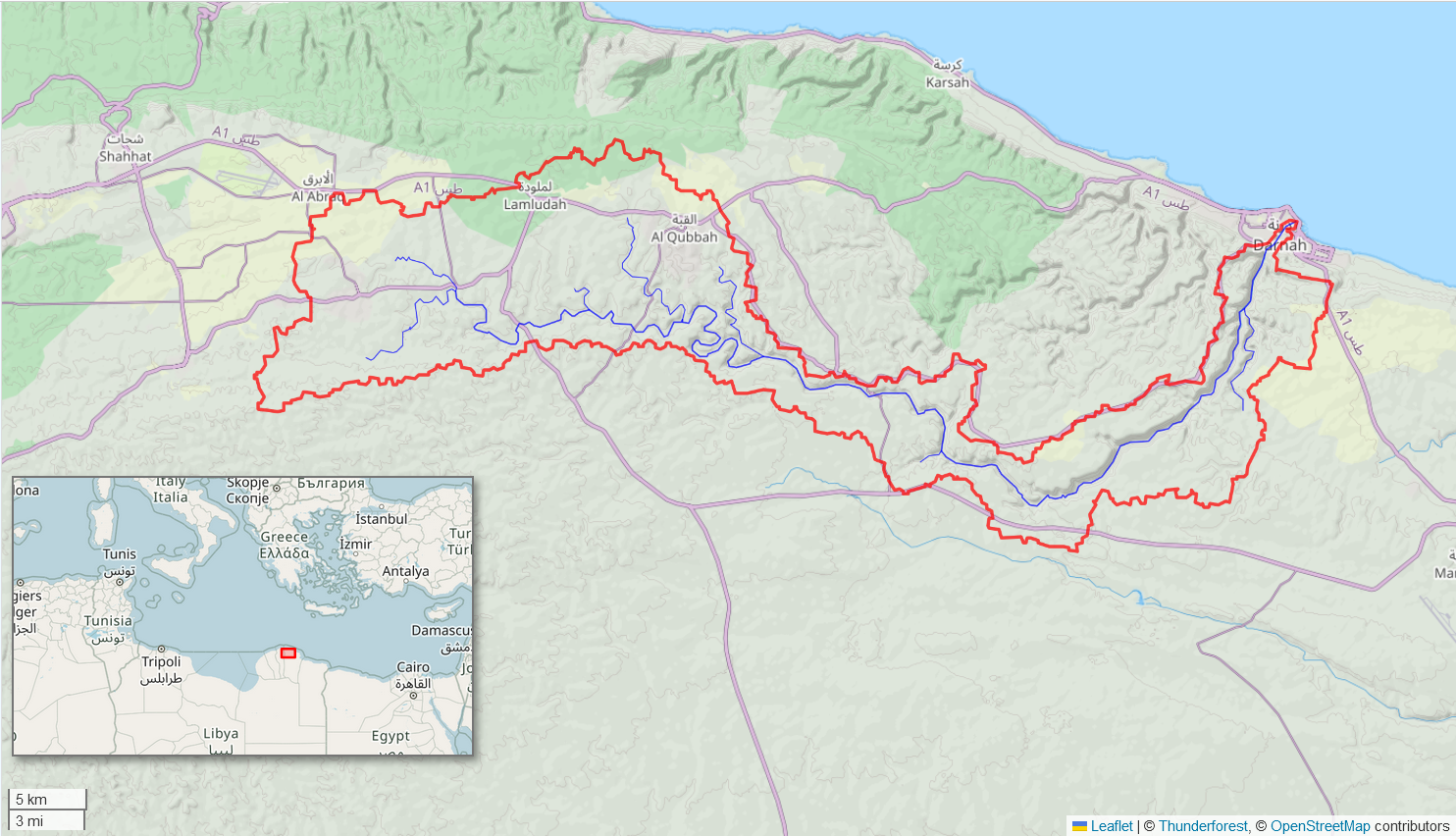
- Wadi Derna drainage basin (Interactive map)

Physical characteristics
- Mouth: Mediterranean Sea
  - coordinates: 32°46′02″N 22°39′05″E

Basin features
- Cities: Derna
- Waterfalls: Derna waterfalls

The Wadi Derna is a river valley in Libya which leads down from the Jebel Akhdar mountains to the port city of Derna. Like many other wadis in North Africa, it is an intermittent riverbed that for much of its length contains water only when heavy rain occurs. It is 75 kilometres (47 mi) long and drains a drainage basin of 575 km^{2}.

== Derna waterfalls ==
The Derna waterfalls are located in Wadi Derna about 7 km (4.3 mi) to the south of Derna.

== 2023 Derna catastrophe ==
In September 2023, against the backdrop of the civil war, torrential rainfall from Storm Daniel led to the collapse of two dams—the Derna dam and the downstream Abu Mansour dam—along the river, causing catastrophic flooding in the city of Derna and killing least 5,923 people. It was one of the deadliest dam failures in history.
