= Derna, Libya =

Port city in Derna District, Libya

Derna درنة
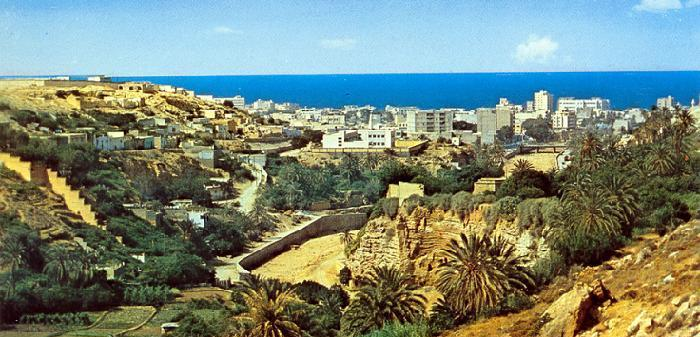
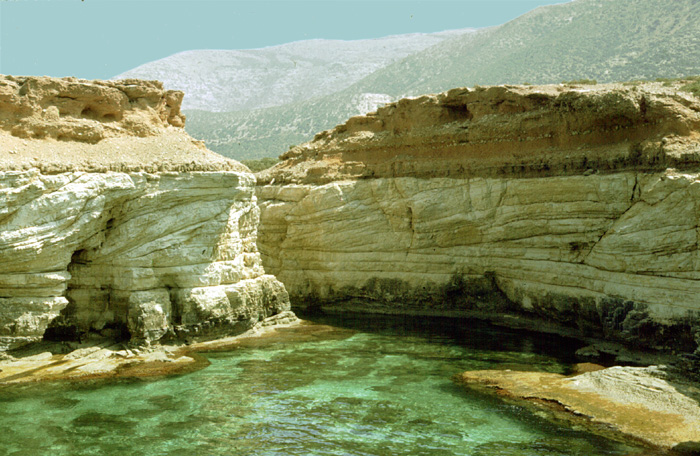
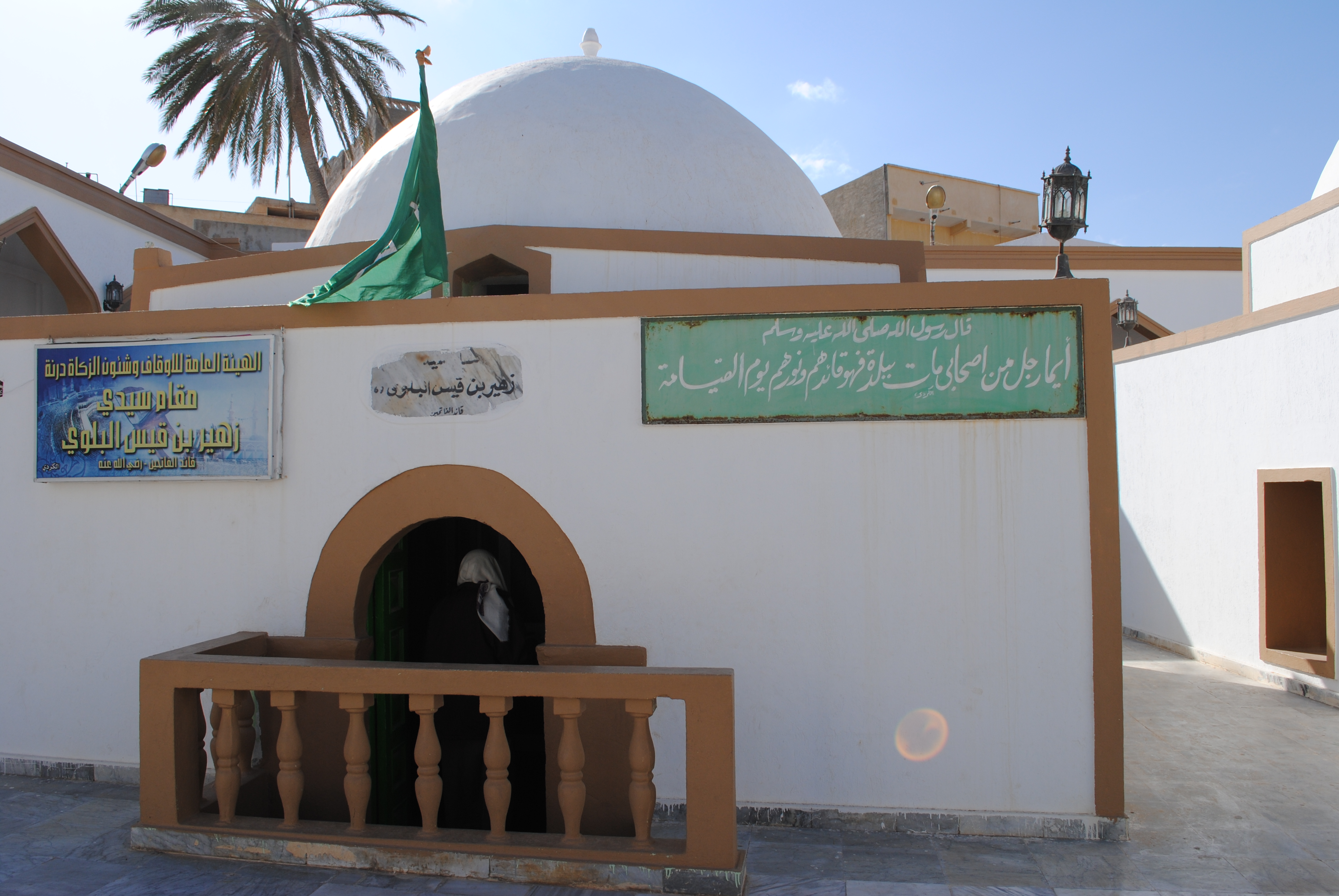
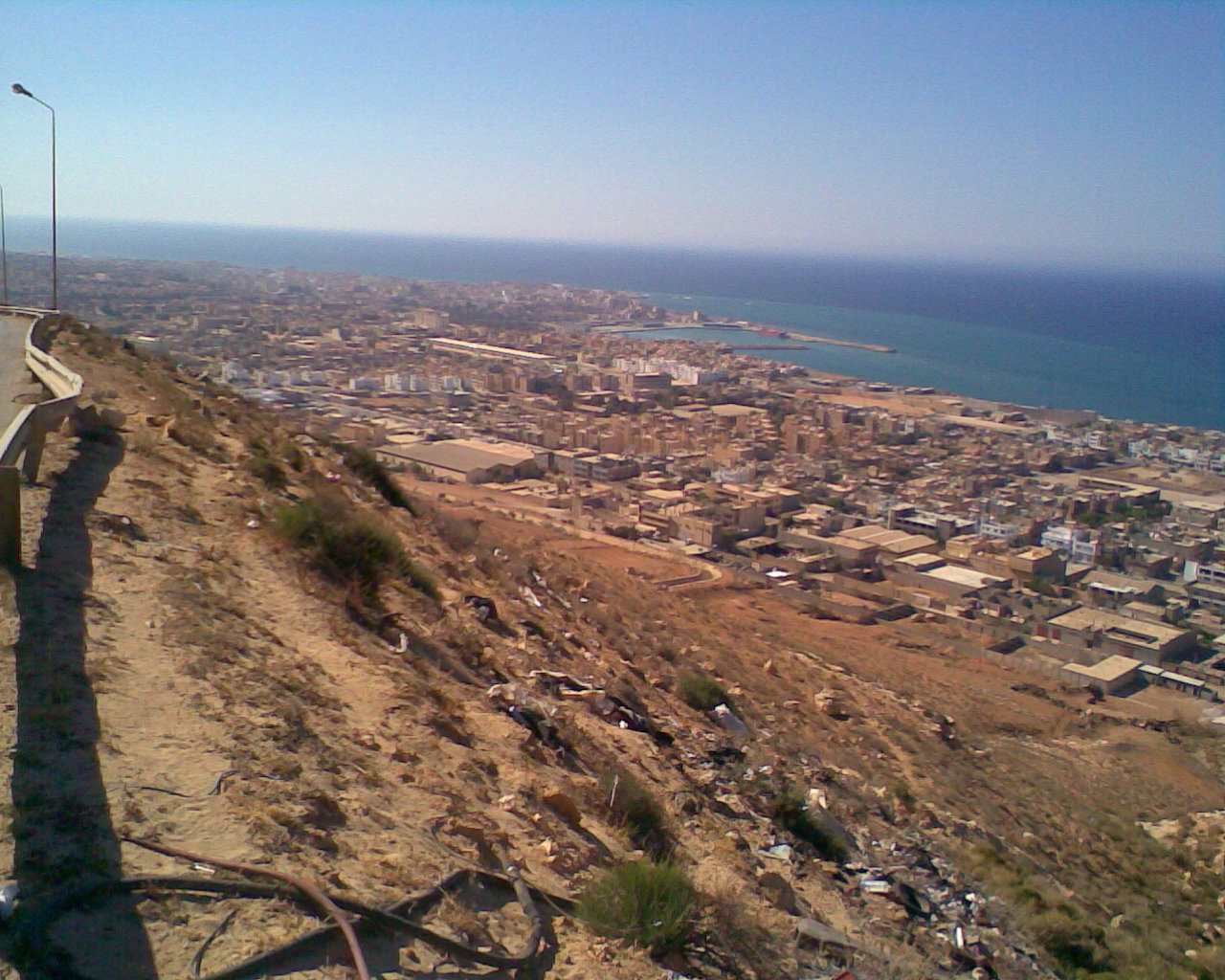
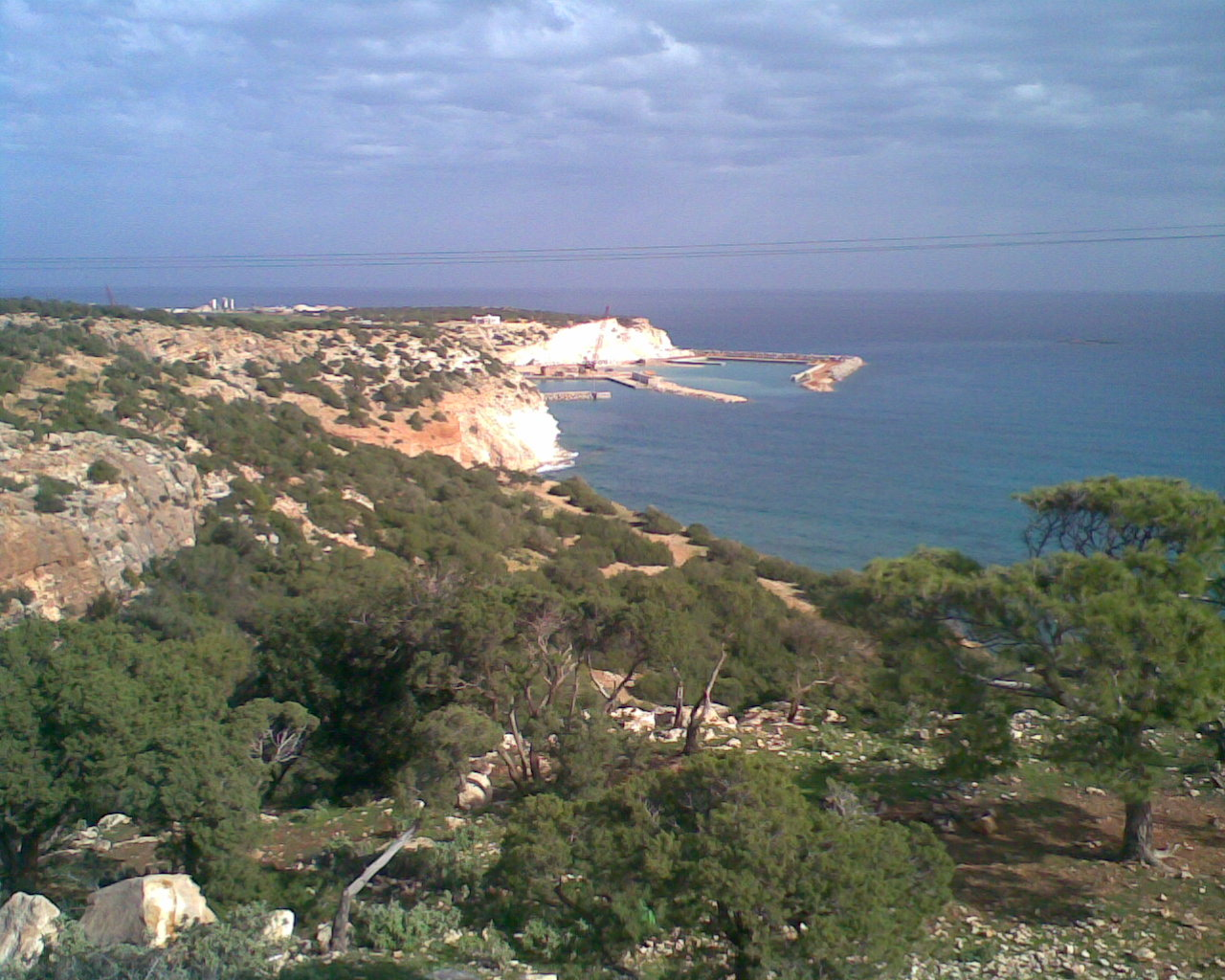
- Overview of Derna
- Interactive map of Derna
- Location in Libya
- Coordinates: 32°45′49″N 22°38′10″E
- Country: Libya
- Region: Cyrenaica
- District: Derna

Population (2026)
  - Total: 111,000
- Time zone: UTC+2 (EET)
- License Plate Code: 10

Derna (/ˈdɜːrnə/; Arabic: درنة Darnah) is a port city in eastern Libya. With a population of around 111,000, Derna was once the seat of one of the wealthiest provinces among the Barbary States. The city is now the administrative capital of Derna District, which covers a much smaller area than the old province. Among Libyan cities, Derna has a unique location and physical environment, as it lies between the Jebel Akhdar (also known as Green Mountain), the Mediterranean Sea, and the desert and is the fourth most important port in Cyrenaica's northern coast after Benghazi, Bayda and Tobruk.

The city was the location of the famous Battle of Derna (1805), the first victory achieved by the United States Military on foreign soil. Occurring during the First Barbary War, the battle was fought between a force of roughly 500 US Marines and Mediterranean mercenaries and 4,000 or 5,000 Barbary troops.

Parts of the city were taken over by Islamic State (IS) militants in October 2014. In June 2015, the Shura Council of Mujahideen in Derna defeated IS and took control of the town, before being expelled themselves by the Libyan National Army in the Battle of Derna (2018–2019).

In September 2023, about a quarter of the city was wiped out by a catastrophic flood caused by the collapse of two dams over the Wadi Derna river against the backdrop of Storm Daniel, resulting in the death of thousands of its residents, although the reported death toll varies by source. Thousands more were injured and some 10,000 to 20,000 others were reported missing.

As of 2024, reconstruction efforts were underway to rebuild roads, bridges and key infrastructure.

== Name ==
Darnis and Darne were the ancient Greek names for the city. The form Dardanis is sometimes found, although this is erroneous. Under Rome the city was referred to as Darnis and Derna. Under the Arabs, it was known as Derneh (Derne, Dernah) or Terneh (Ternah).

== History ==
=== Classic era and Middle Ages ===
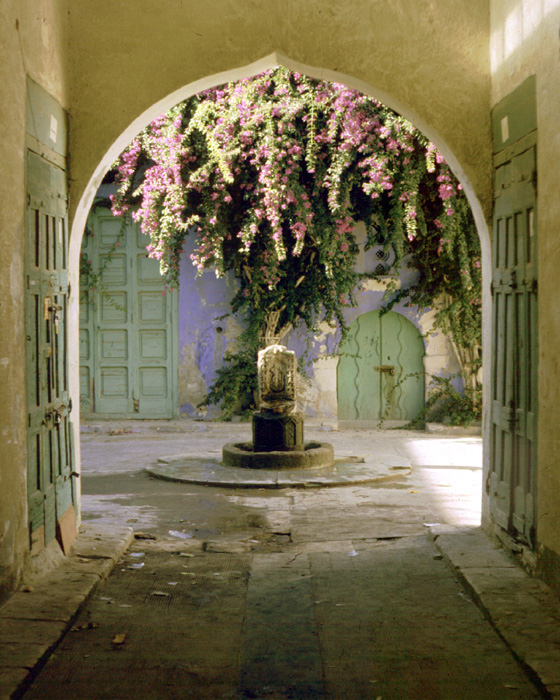
Old Market of Derna

In the Hellenistic period the ancient city of Darnis was part of the Libyan Pentapolis colonized by the Greeks. Under Rome, it became a civil and later the religious metropolis of the province of Libya Secunda, or Libya Inferior, that is, the Marmarica region. The names of some of its metropolitan bishops are found in extant documents. Piso was one of the Eastern bishops who withdrew from the Council of Sardica and set up their own council at Philippopolis in 347. Early 5th-century Dioscorus is known because of a dispute he had with the bishop of Erythrum. Daniel took part in the Council of Ephesus in 431. In addition, John Moschus speaks of a bishop Thedodorus of Darnis as having had a vision of Saint Leo the Great in the mid-5th century.

No longer a residential bishopric, Darnis is today listed by the Catholic Church as a titular see.

The city was resettled by the refugees from Islamic Spain (Expulsion of the Moriscos) in 1493 on the site of the ancient settlement.

=== Modern era ===
==== Ottoman times ====
Under Ottoman rule, Derna was initially under the governor at Tripoli, but shortly after 1711, it fell under the Karamanli sultanate until 1835, when it became a dependency of the autonomous sanjak of Benghazi, essentially Cyrenaica, which was governed directly from Constantinople. This in turn, in 1875, became the vilayet of Cyrenaica. In the 1850s, it had an estimated 4,500 inhabitants, who lived by agriculture, fishing and the coastal trade.

The oldest mosque in Derna is Al-masjeed al-ateeq, or the "Old Mosque", restored by wali Mahmoud Karamanli in 1772, vaulted with 42 small cupolas. This kind of vault was in use due to lack of some materials, like timber or stone in the region of Cyrenaica. There is another mosque, named Masjeed az-zawiyah, built in 1846, more strictly curved in the side of a hill.

The French admiral Gantheaume landed at Derna in June 1800 in an attempt to reinforce Napoleon in Egypt by bringing troops overland, but was rebuffed by the local garrison.

Derna was the location of the 1805 Battle of Derne, in which forces under U.S. Lieutenant and former Consul to Tripoli William Eaton—who had marched 500 miles (800 km) across the Libyan Desert from Alexandria—captured the city as part of the First Barbary War.

Ottoman rule in Derna came to an end on 16 October 1911, with the city's capture by Italian troops during the Italo-Turkish War.

==== World War II ====
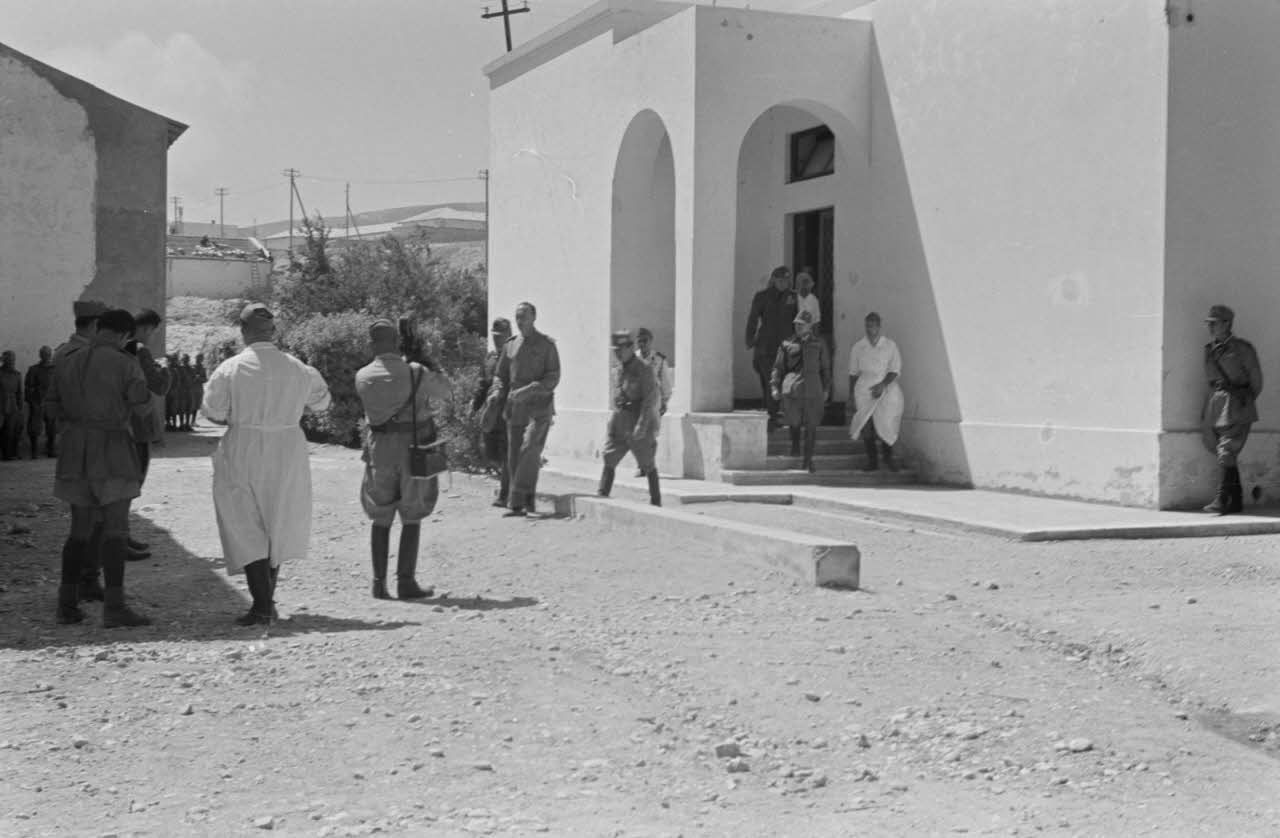
Italian leader Benito Mussolini in Derna

The Italian rule over Derna lasted 29 years, 3 months, and 14 days until it was captured on 30 January 1941 by Australian Troops during the Second World War's North African Campaign. On 6 April 1941, German forces retook the city from the British, and on 15 November 1942, British forces recaptured it.

The airbase that became RAF_Derna and the nearby Martuba Airbase were strategic hubs for air support to the land campaigns in the Western Desert and attacks on shipping in the Mediterranean.

==== Libyan Republic and civil war ====
In 2007, American troops in Iraq uncovered a list of foreign fighters for the Iraqi insurgency. Of the 112 Libyans on the list, 52 had come from Derna. Derna has the reputation of being the most fundamentalist Muslim city in Libya.

Following mass protests on 18 February 2011, the city came under the control of the National Transitional Council, breaking from the Libyan government. The city was never retaken before Gaddafi's ouster from Tripoli and the establishment of a new government. In October 2014, local militants affiliated with the Islamic Youth Shura Council publicly pledged allegiance to Abu Bakr al-Baghdadi, the leader of the Islamic State. In November 2014, al-Baghdadi released an audio-recording accepting the pledge of allegiance and announced the expansion of his group. On June 28, 2018, forces loyal to Khalifa Haftar claimed to have taken full control of the city, following a two-year siege of the city that culminated in a month-long battle.

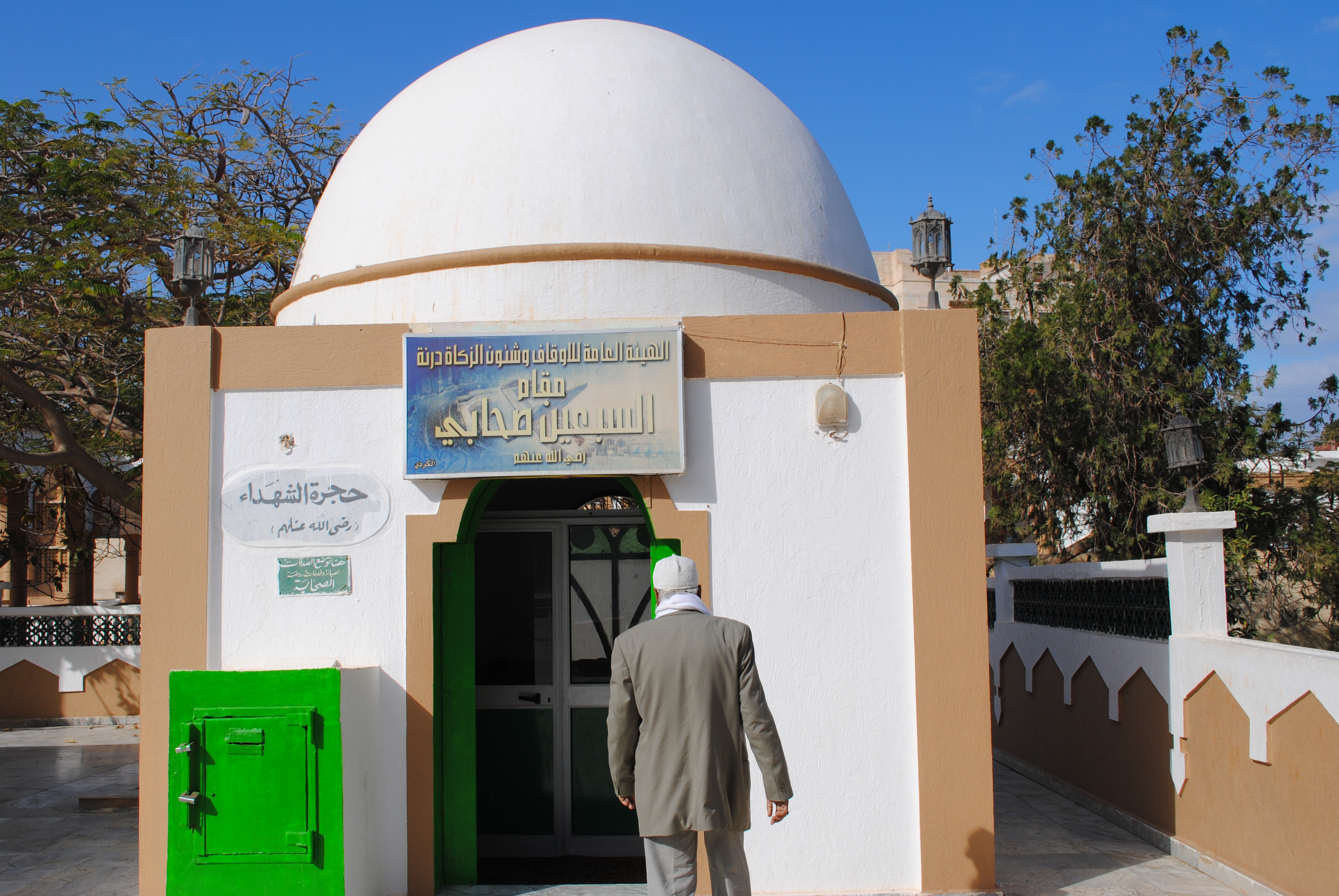
Mausoleum of a Sahaba before its destruction by Salafis

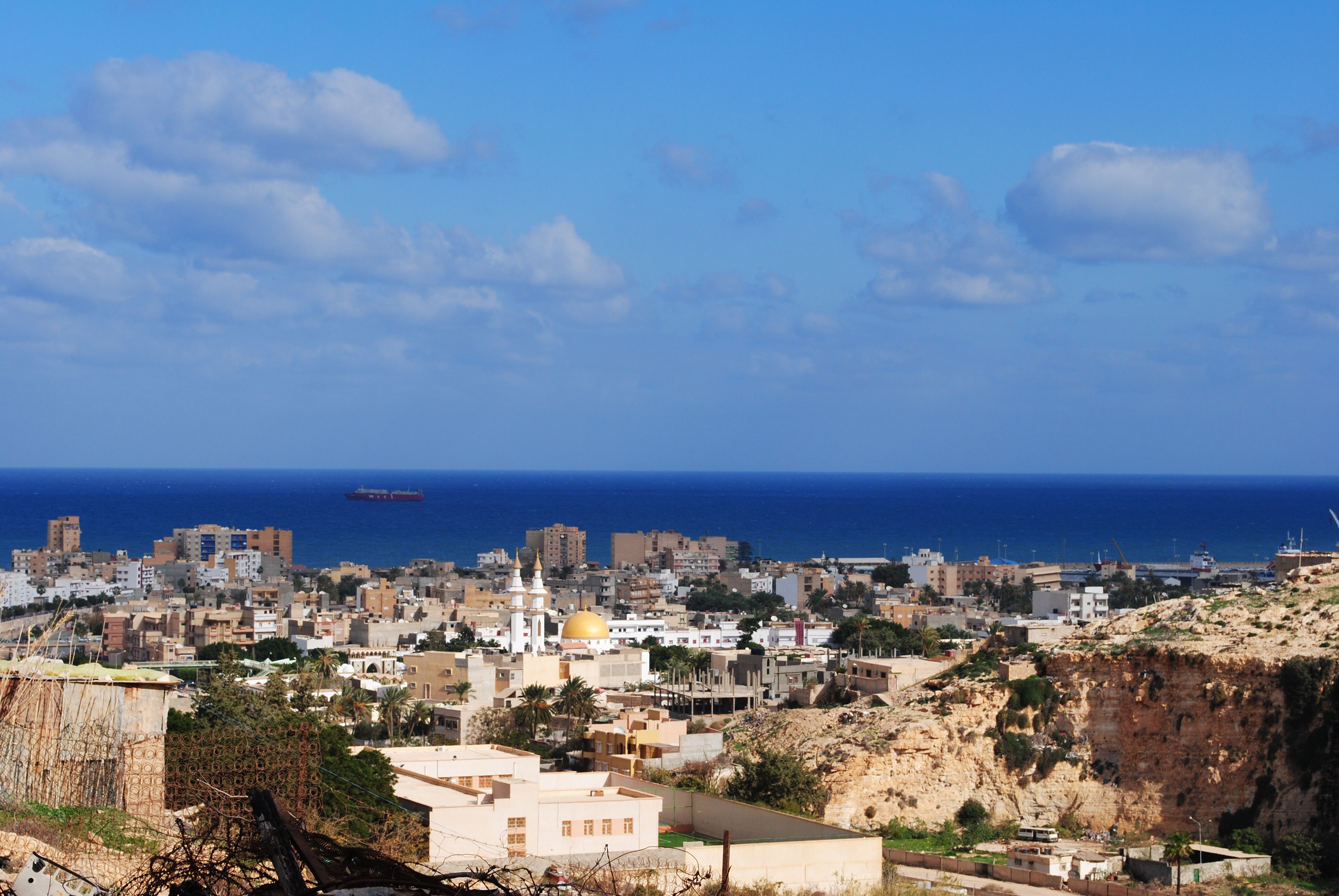
Mosque and Shrine of Sahaba in Derna, 2009

Battle of Derna, 2018

==== Storm Daniel ====
On 10 September 2023, Storm Daniel made landfall in Libya near Benghazi. While moving east-southeast, the storm caused torrential rainfall and extreme flooding in Derna, prompting the government to declare a state of emergency for the area, after collapses in the early morning of the next day of the Derna dam and the Mansour dam, which caused floodwaters to inundate the areas of the city around the Wadi Derna. At least 4,352 people were confirmed dead, with more than 11,300 casualties initially estimated. Meanwhile, a government minister said that 25% of Derna had "disappeared", with large parts of the city washed out to sea.

== Geography ==
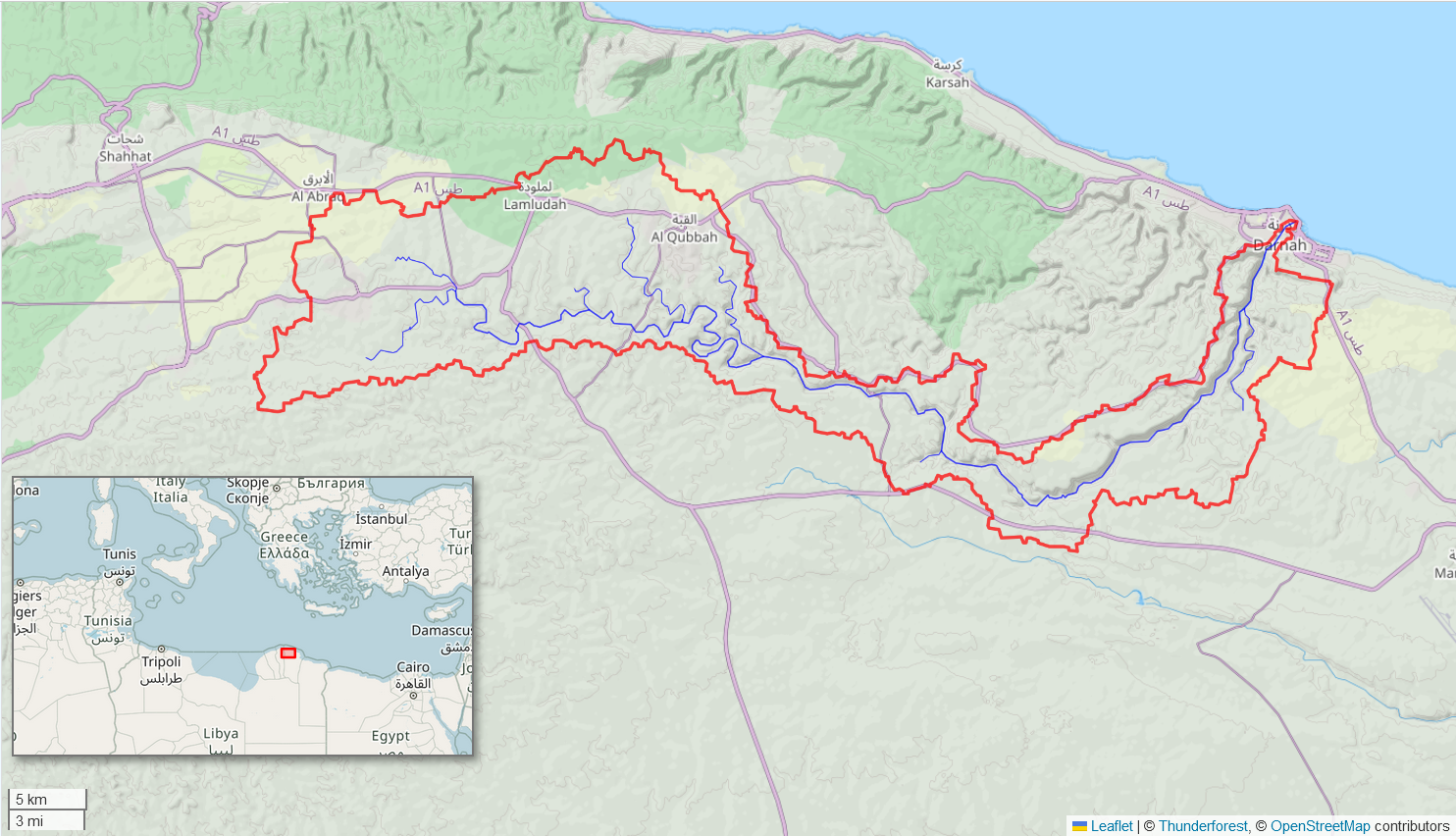
Map of the Wadi Derna watershed, covering 540 km² in eastern Libya

Derna is located at the eastern end of the Jebel Akhdar, one of the very few forested areas in Libya; due to its arid climate, forest makes up a mere 0.1% of Libya's land area. However, Derna is near the fertile upland area of eastern Libya, which is the wettest region in the country, receiving some 600 millimetres (24 in) of precipitation annually.

The city is built along the Wadi Derna, an ephemeral river that is dry much of the year. Historically, the city has been repeatedly damaged by floods. The Abu Mansur and Derna dams upstream of the city were meant to control soil erosion and prevent flooding. Both dams were destroyed by high flow following Mediterranean Storm Daniel in September 2023. The dambreaks appear to have contributed significantly to flood damage and fatalities in Derna.

Derna is linked with Shahhat by two roads; the inner one running through Al Qubah is part of the Libyan Coastal Highway and the coastal one running through Susa and Ras al Helal.

=== Climate ===
Derna features a hot semi-arid climate (Köppen BSh) with strong Mediterranean influences: essentially all the modest annual rains fall between October and March. The annual rainfall is around 275 millimetres or 11 inches. Its maritime location allows it to have an extreme seasonal lag that is incredibly uncommon for a dry climate. However, the influence of the Sahara allows for the extreme record highs to occur months before the average warmest months.

In winter, the city's average temperature ranges between 9 and 20 °C (48.2 and 68.0 °F). Summers are quite long and effectively rainless with afternoon temperatures averaging well above 27 °C or 80.6 °F between June and October.

Climate data for Derna, Libya
| Month | Jan | Feb | Mar | Apr | May | Jun | Jul | Aug | Sep | Oct | Nov | Dec | Year |
|---|---|---|---|---|---|---|---|---|---|---|---|---|---|
| Record high °C (°F) | 29.6 (85.3) | 32.8 (91.0) | 35.8 (96.4) | 38.3 (100.9) | 44.0 (111.2) | 44.8 (112.6) | 41.7 (107.1) | 43.5 (110.3) | 40.6 (105.1) | 39.0 (102.2) | 37.8 (100.0) | 30.6 (87.1) | 44.8 (112.6) |
| Mean daily maximum °C (°F) | 17.5 (63.5) | 18.2 (64.8) | 19.4 (66.9) | 21.7 (71.1) | 24.3 (75.7) | 27.3 (81.1) | 28.2 (82.8) | 29.1 (84.4) | 28.1 (82.6) | 26.1 (79.0) | 23.1 (73.6) | 19.2 (66.6) | 23.5 (74.3) |
| Daily mean °C (°F) | 14.1 (57.4) | 14.5 (58.1) | 15.6 (60.1) | 17.7 (63.9) | 20.3 (68.5) | 23.5 (74.3) | 25.3 (77.5) | 26.1 (79.0) | 25.0 (77.0) | 22.4 (72.3) | 19.3 (66.7) | 15.7 (60.3) | 20.0 (68.0) |
| Mean daily minimum °C (°F) | 10.7 (51.3) | 10.8 (51.4) | 11.7 (53.1) | 13.8 (56.8) | 16.2 (61.2) | 19.7 (67.5) | 22.3 (72.1) | 23.2 (73.8) | 21.9 (71.4) | 18.6 (65.5) | 15.5 (59.9) | 12.2 (54.0) | 16.4 (61.5) |
| Record low °C (°F) | 4.4 (39.9) | 4.4 (39.9) | 5.0 (41.0) | 6.7 (44.1) | 8.7 (47.7) | 8.3 (46.9) | 10.0 (50.0) | 18.3 (64.9) | 14.5 (58.1) | 10.0 (50.0) | 8.3 (46.9) | 6.7 (44.1) | 4.4 (39.9) |
| Average rainfall mm (inches) | 60 (2.4) | 39 (1.5) | 28 (1.1) | 10 (0.4) | 6 (0.2) | 2 (0.1) | 0 (0) | 0 (0) | 4 (0.2) | 32 (1.3) | 36 (1.4) | 57 (2.2) | 274 (10.8) |
| Average rainy days (≥ 0.1 mm) | 11 | 8 | 7 | 3 | 2 | 0 | 0 | 0 | 1 | 5 | 6 | 5 | 48 |
| Average relative humidity (%) | 76 | 72 | 74 | 74 | 74 | 75 | 80 | 80 | 75 | 74 | 75 | 78 | 76 |
| Mean monthly sunshine hours | 151.9 | 189.3 | 204.6 | 231.0 | 282.1 | 297.0 | 316.2 | 297.6 | 237.0 | 223.2 | 189.0 | 145.7 | 2,764.6 |
| Mean daily sunshine hours | 4.9 | 6.7 | 6.6 | 7.7 | 9.1 | 9.9 | 10.2 | 9.6 | 7.9 | 7.2 | 6.3 | 4.7 | 7.7 |
Source 1: Deutscher Wetterdienst
Source 2: Arab Meteorology Book (sun only)

== Politics ==
The entire city council of Derna were dismissed after the flooding.

== Architecture ==
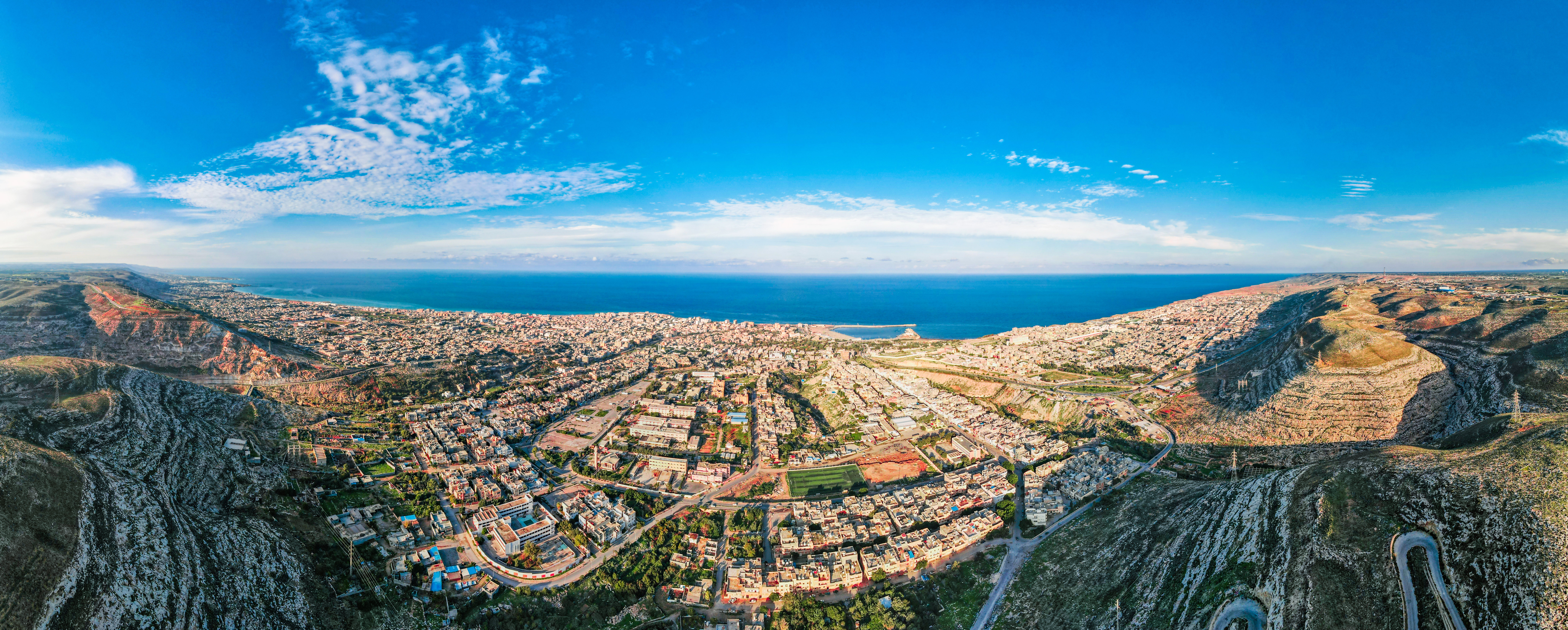
Panoramic view (December 2020)

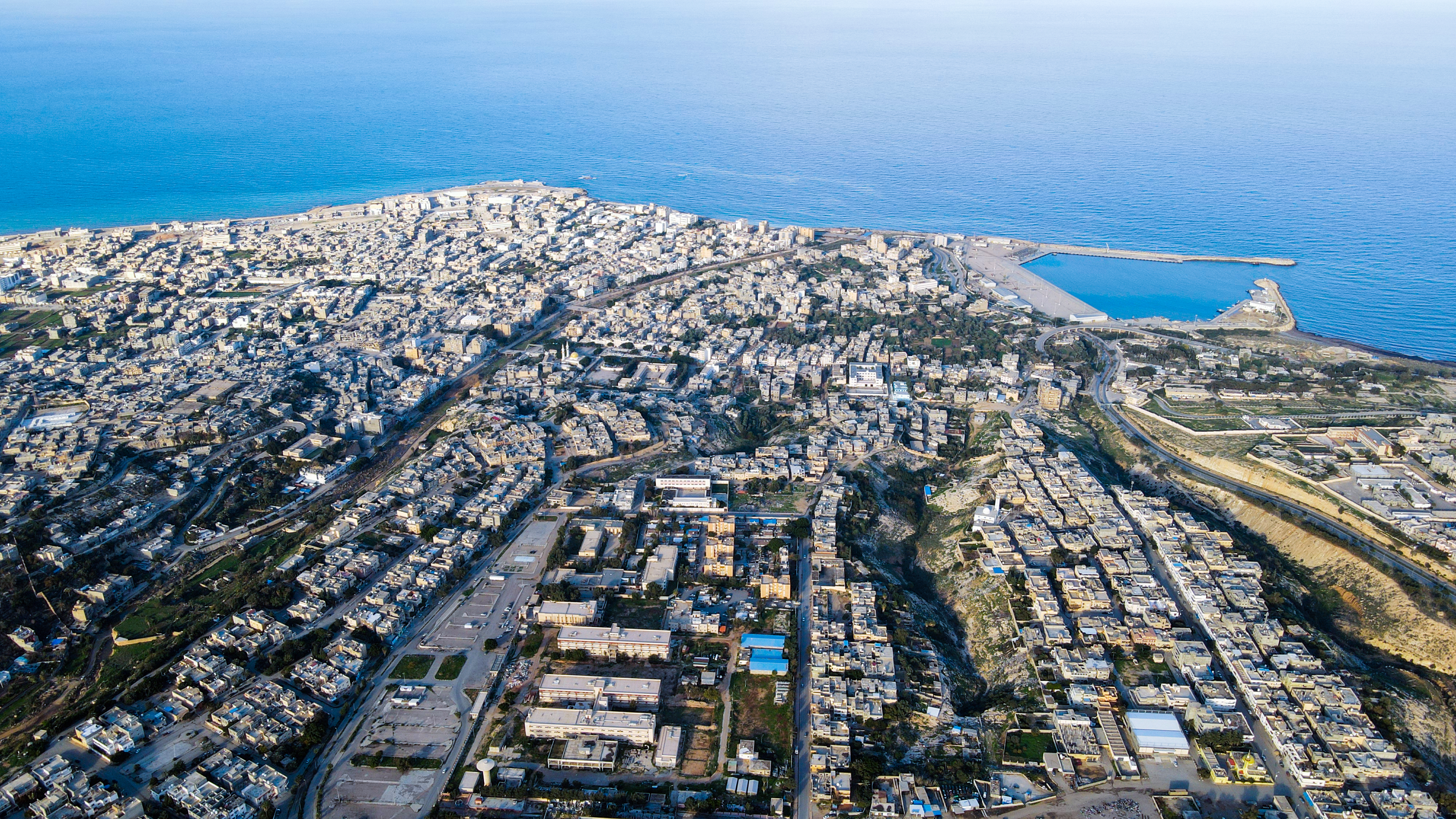
Cityscape (December 2020)

Derna has three main squares. The most popular square is the Maydan Assahabah. This square was always used for mass demonstrations against Libyan leader Muammar Gaddafi. The city is also a tourist hub due to its old city (the Medina), which is home to Islamic architecture.

== See also ==
- List of cities in Libya
