= Qandula =

Qandula قندولة Gandoula
- Town
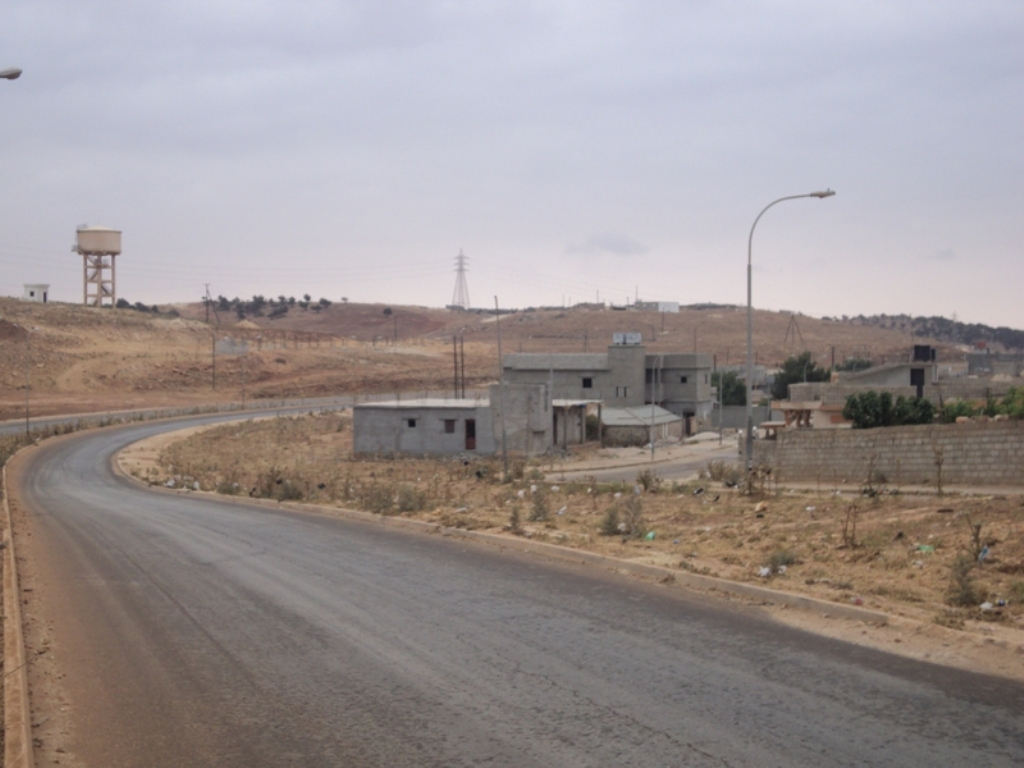

- Location in Libya
- Coordinates: 32°32′16″N 21°34′33″E
- Country: Libya
- Region: Cyrenaica
- District: Jabal al Akhdar

Population (2006)
  - Total: 5,583
- Time zone: UTC + 2

Qandula is a town in the District of Jabal al Akhdar in north-eastern Libya. It is located 25 km south of Bayda.
