= Hisham Chkiouat =

Libyan politician

Hisham Chkiouat is a Libyan politician who is currently serving as aviation minister in the Government of National Stability since 2022.
