= Othman Abduljalil =

Libyan politician

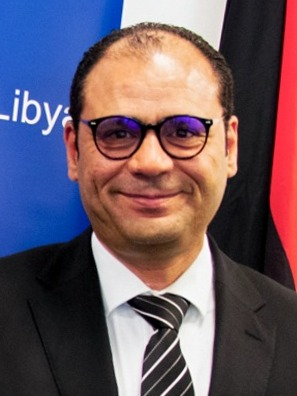

Minister of Health
- Incumbent
- Assumed office 2022

Othman Abduljalil is a Libyan politician who is currently serving as health minister in the Government of National Stability.
