= Black Horse (Libyan company) =

Libyan arms manufacturing company

- Native name: الحصان الاسود
- Type: Private
- Industry: Armoured vehicles
- Founded: 2017
- Headquarters: Misrata, Libya
- Website: blackhorse.ly/en1/

Black Horse Co (Arabic: الحصان الاسود) is a state-owned arms company affiliated with the Libyan Ministry of Defence.

== History ==
Black Horse was founded by Muhammad ben Madi in 2017 as an armoured glass company in the city of Misrata. It expanded to armour building.

In 2019, during the Second Libyan Civil War, the company was adopted under the Ministry of Defence to manufacture armoured vehicles for the Libyan Army, Central Bank, Ministry of Justice and the Ministry of Interior. This included the manufacture of the first armoured vehicle KJ-4.

== Models ==
The company produces two series of armoured vehicles. Both series use the V6 engine and a BR7 lamination.. Often mounted with the PK machine gun manufactured by the MIO.

=== KJ series ===
- KJ-4 (2019)
- 111th Brigade Majhfal as Light Armoured Vehicle
- KJ-5 (2020)
- KJ-6 (2021)
- KJ-7 (2022): an Anti-tank guided missile variant, Observed within 444th tank units. Used as a Light tank
- KJ-8 (2023)

=== CAN series ===
- CAN-1 (2023)
- Generally confused with INKAS or Striet
