= Mohamed Al-Shrif =

Libyan General

Mohamed Al-Shrif محمد الشريف
- Born: Mohamed Ali Mohamed Mahdy Al-Shrif محمد علي محمد مهدي الشريف; 1960 (age 65–66); Waddan, Libya
- Military career
- Allegiance: Libya; Government of National Accord
- Branch: Libyan Armed Forces
- Service years: 1985–present
- Rank: General
- Service number: 2699
- Commands: Chief of the General Staff of the Libyan Armed Forces
- Conflicts: Chadian–Libyan conflict; Second Libyan Civil War; 2019–20 Western Libya campaign

Gen. Mohamed Al-Shrif (born 1960) is a Libyan military officer. From 2019 to 2020 he was the Chief of the General Staff of the Libyan Armed Forces, loyal to the GNA.

Al-Shrif graduated with the 18th patch of the Libyan Military Academy. He participated in the Chadian–Libyan conflict under Khalifa Haftar.

Al-Shrif was replaced by Lieutenant General Mohammed al-Haddad as Chief of the General Staff of the Libyan Armed Forces on 17 September 2020.
