= Dassault Falcon 50 =

Midsize three engine long range business jet

Falcon 50
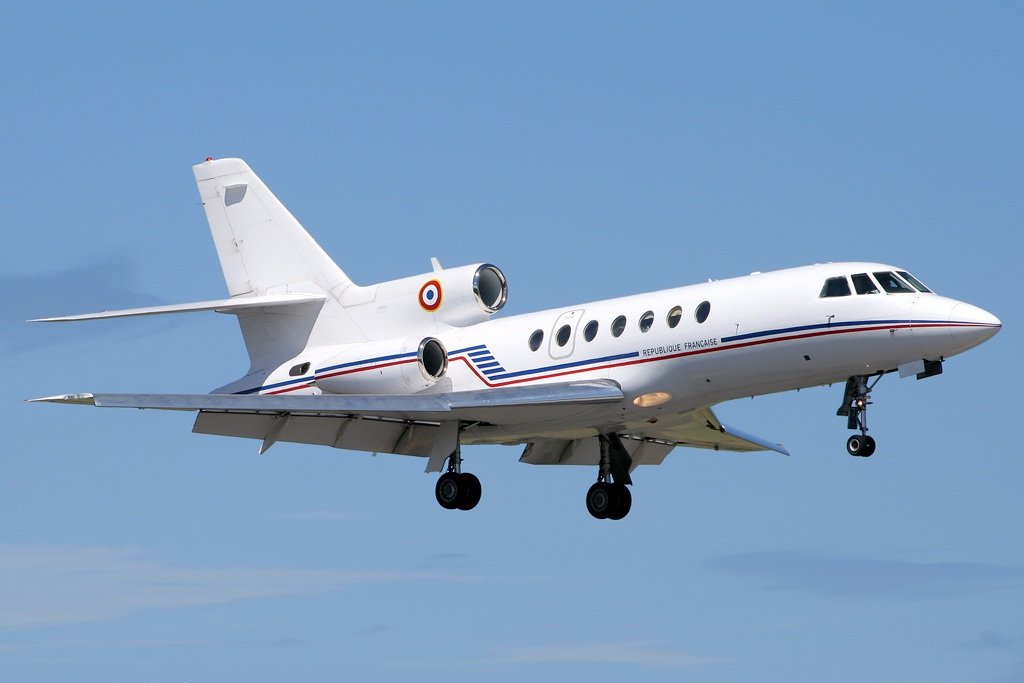
- French Air Force Falcon 50

General information
- Type: Business jet
- Manufacturer: Dassault Aviation
- Status: In service
- Primary users: Armee de l'Air South African Air Force; Portuguese Air Force; Italian Air Force
- Number built: 352

History
- Manufactured: 1976–2008
- First flight: 7 November 1976
- Developed from: Dassault Falcon 20
- Developed into: Dassault Falcon 900

The Dassault Falcon 50 is a French super-midsize, long-range business jet, featuring a trijet layout with an S-duct air intake for the central engine. It has the same fuselage cross-section and similar capacity as the earlier twin-engined Falcon 20, but was a new design that is area ruled and includes a more advanced wing design.

== Design and development ==
The first prototype flew on 7 November 1976, with French airworthiness certification on 27 February 1979, followed by U.S. Federal Aviation Administration certification on 7 March 1979. Dassault developed a maritime surveillance and environmental protection version as the Gardian 50.

The Falcon 50 was later updated as the Falcon 50EX, the first of which flew in 1996, and the last of which was delivered in 2008. The Falcon 50EX features improved engines and other enhancements to give further range improvements to an already long-range jet. The Falcon 50EX designation applies to serial numbers 253–352, which marks the end of the production line for the Falcon 50/50EX.

Successors to the Falcon 50 are the Falcon 7X and the Falcon 900 featuring a larger fuselage and the same three-engine arrangement. Dassault announced in January 2008 what is essentially a replacement aircraft for the Falcon 50, codenamed the "SMS" (Super Mid Size). The basic design process, including engine selection, was supposed to be completed by early 2009. However, in a June 2009 press conference, CEO Charles Edelstenne said that all design choices had been reopened and the goal was extended to the end of the year.

Dassault and Aviation Partners Inc. have developed and certified High Mach blended winglets for the Falcon 50 & 50EX as a retrofit kit.

By 2018, Falcon 50s from the mid-late 1980s were priced at $0.879 to $1.6 million while 1998-2003 Falcon 50EXs can be had for $2.95 to $3.95 million.

== Variants ==
Falcon 50
Basic initial variant with Honeywell TFE 731-3-1C engines and optional auxiliary power unit (APU); 252 manufactured, with one serving as a prototype for the Falcon 50EX.

Falcon 50EX

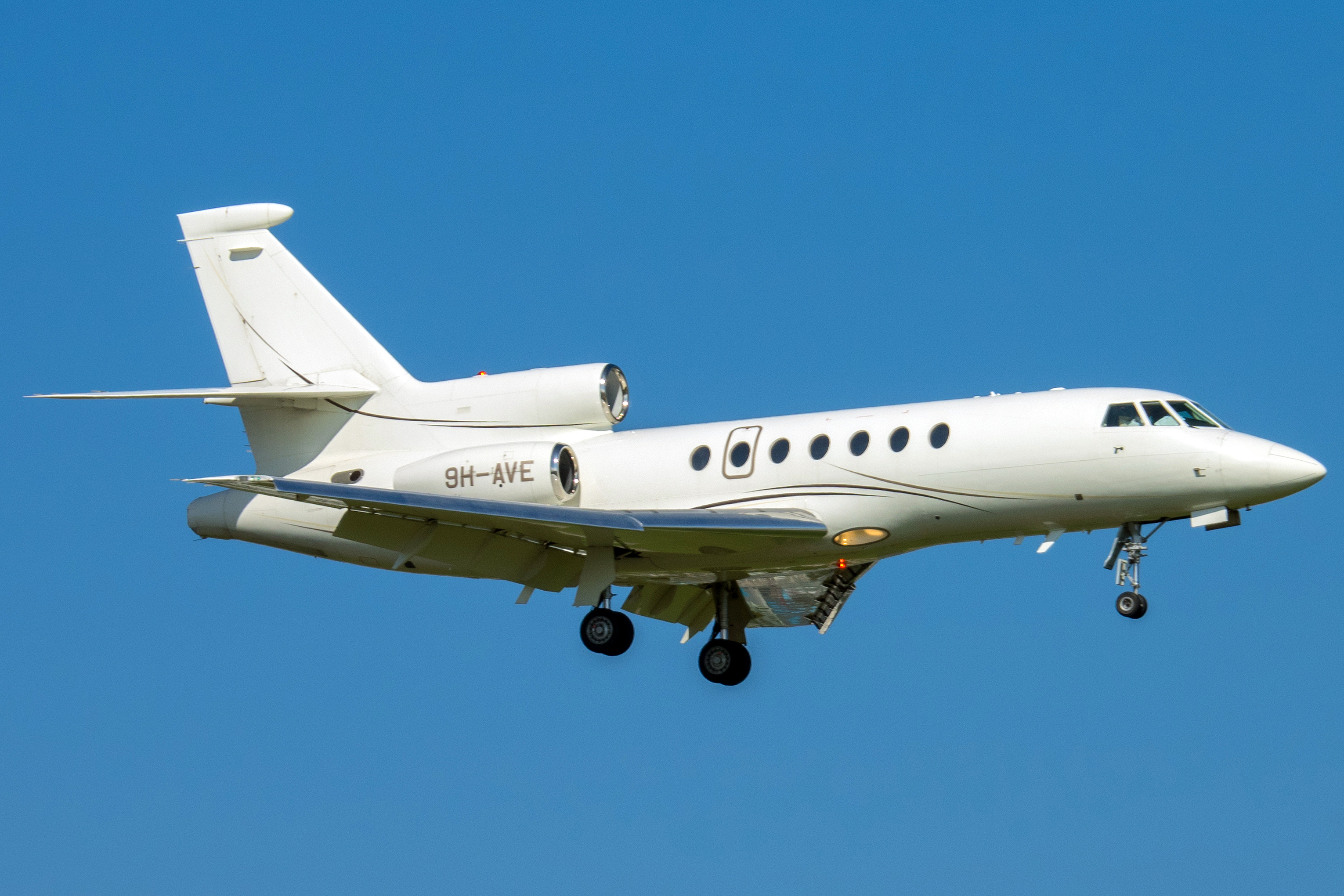
Falcon 50EX

Marketing name for Falcon 50 with 3 DEEC (Digital Electronic Engine Control) controlled TFE 731-40 engines; an APU installed as standard equipment; changes to the rudder control system; updated avionics; and other improvements; 100 manufactured, plus one modified Falcon 50

Falcon 50 "Susanna"
Single Falcon 50 for Iraq modified with a Cyrano IV-C5 radar and hardpoints to carry two AM-39 Exocet antiship missiles. Used for training Mirage F1 crews and possibly carried out the attack on the USS Stark on May 17, 1987. This aircraft was flown to Iran during the Persian Gulf War and was not returned.

== Operators ==
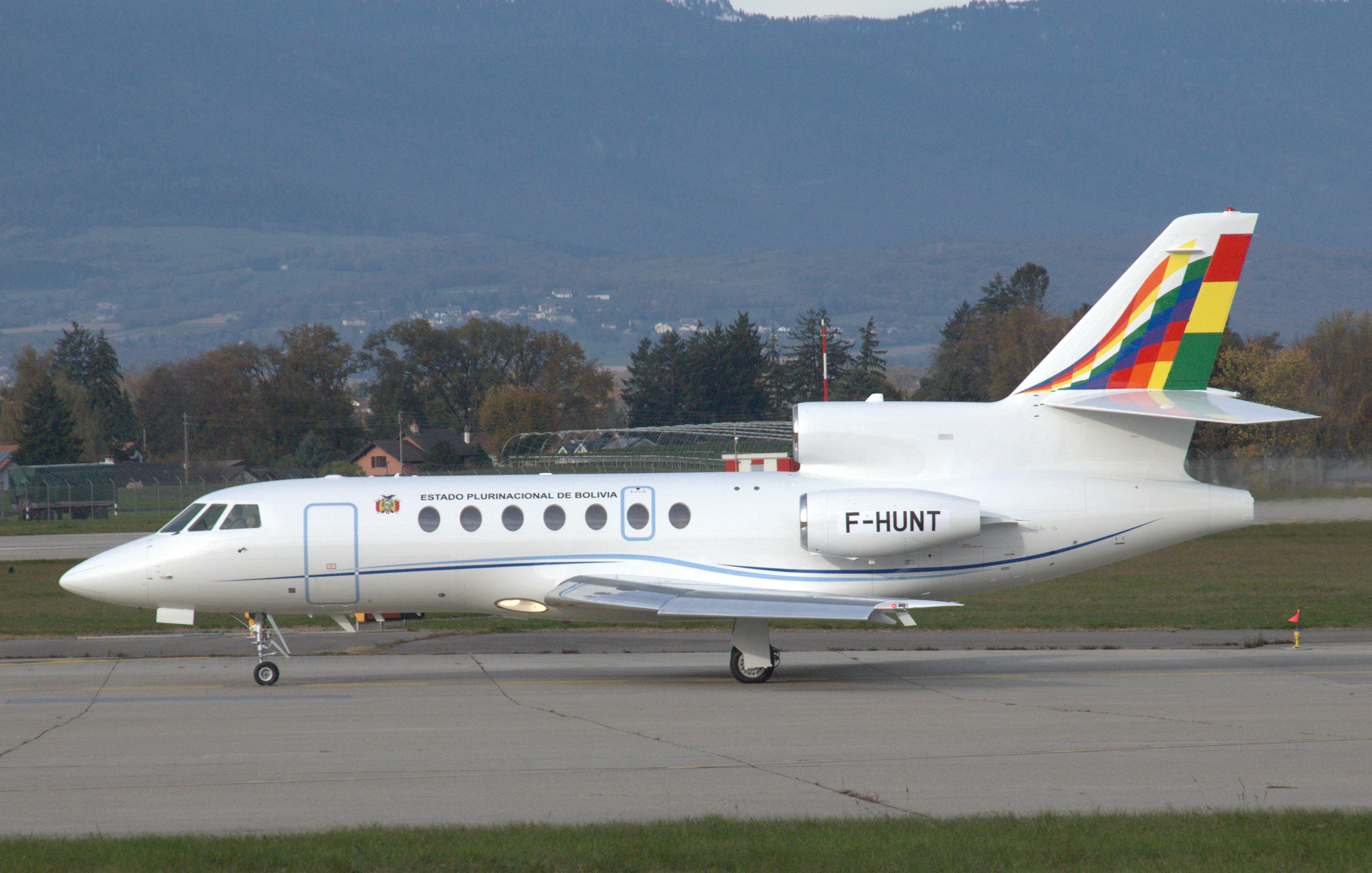
Falcon 50EX of the Bolivian Air Force for vice-presidential use

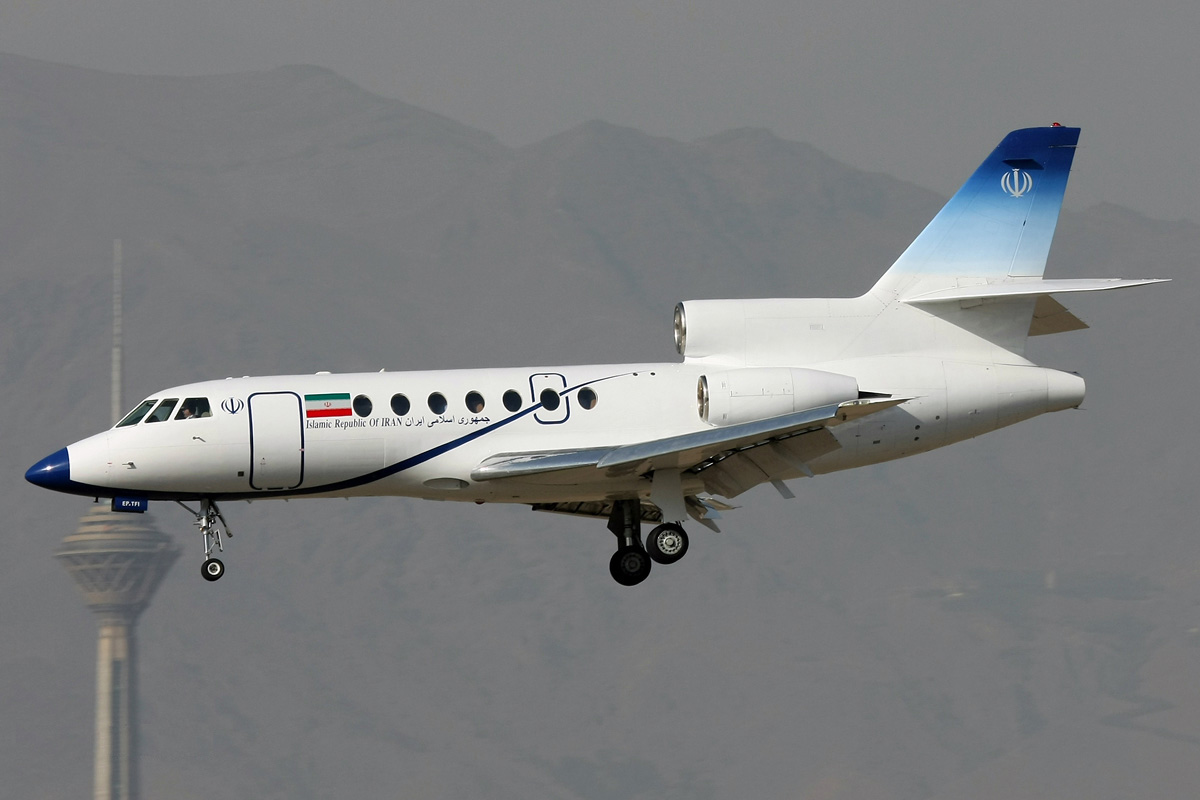
Falcon 50 of the Iranian government landing at Mehrabad International Airport in Tehran

The majority of Falcon 50s are operated by corporate and individual owners.

=== Military and government operators ===
Benin
Bolivia

- Bolivian Air Force

Bulgaria

- Bulgarian Air Force - former operator

Burundi
Djibouti

- Djibouti Air Force

France

- French Air Force - former operator
- French Navy operate eight Falcon 50M for maritime surveillance.

Egypt

- Egyptian Air Force - former operator

Iran

- Iranian Air Force
- Iranian government

Iraq

- Iraqi Air Force - former operator of three Falcon 50s, one of which was the aforementioned Falcon 50 "Susanna"

Italy

- The Italian Air Force operated four Falcon 50s from 1985 until 2005, when two aircraft were retired.

Jordan

- Royal Jordanian Air Force
- Jordanian Royal Flight; Libya

Morocco

- Royal Moroccan Air Force

Portugal

- Portuguese Air Force

Rwanda
Serbia

- Government of Serbia

South Africa

- South African Air Force

Spain

- Spanish Air Force

Sudan

- Sudan Government

Switzerland

- Swiss Air Force

Venezuela

- Venezuelan Air Force

== Accidents and incidents ==
- 6 April 1994: Rwandan President Juvénal Habyarimana and Burundian President Cyprien Ntaryamira were killed when the Falcon 50 they were travelling in (registration 9XR-NN) was shot down near Kigali, Rwanda, triggering the Rwandan genocide.
- 20 October 2014: Falcon 50EX F-GLSA collided with a snow plow while taking off from Moscow Vnukovo Airport, Russia, killing all four people on board, including the CEO of Total oil and gas company Christophe de Margerie.
- 27 September 2018: a runway overrun by chartered Falcon 50 N114TD, at Greenville, South Carolina, USA, resulted in the death of the pilot and copilot, as well as serious injuries to two passengers. The pilots had reportedly violated several FAA regulations, in undertaking the flight that led to the incident.
- 23 December 2025: a Falcon 50 crashed near Kesikkavak, Haymana, Turkey, killing eight people. Among the deceased was the commander of the Libyan Armed Forces, Mohammed Ali Ahmed al-Haddad.

== Specifications (50EX) ==
side view

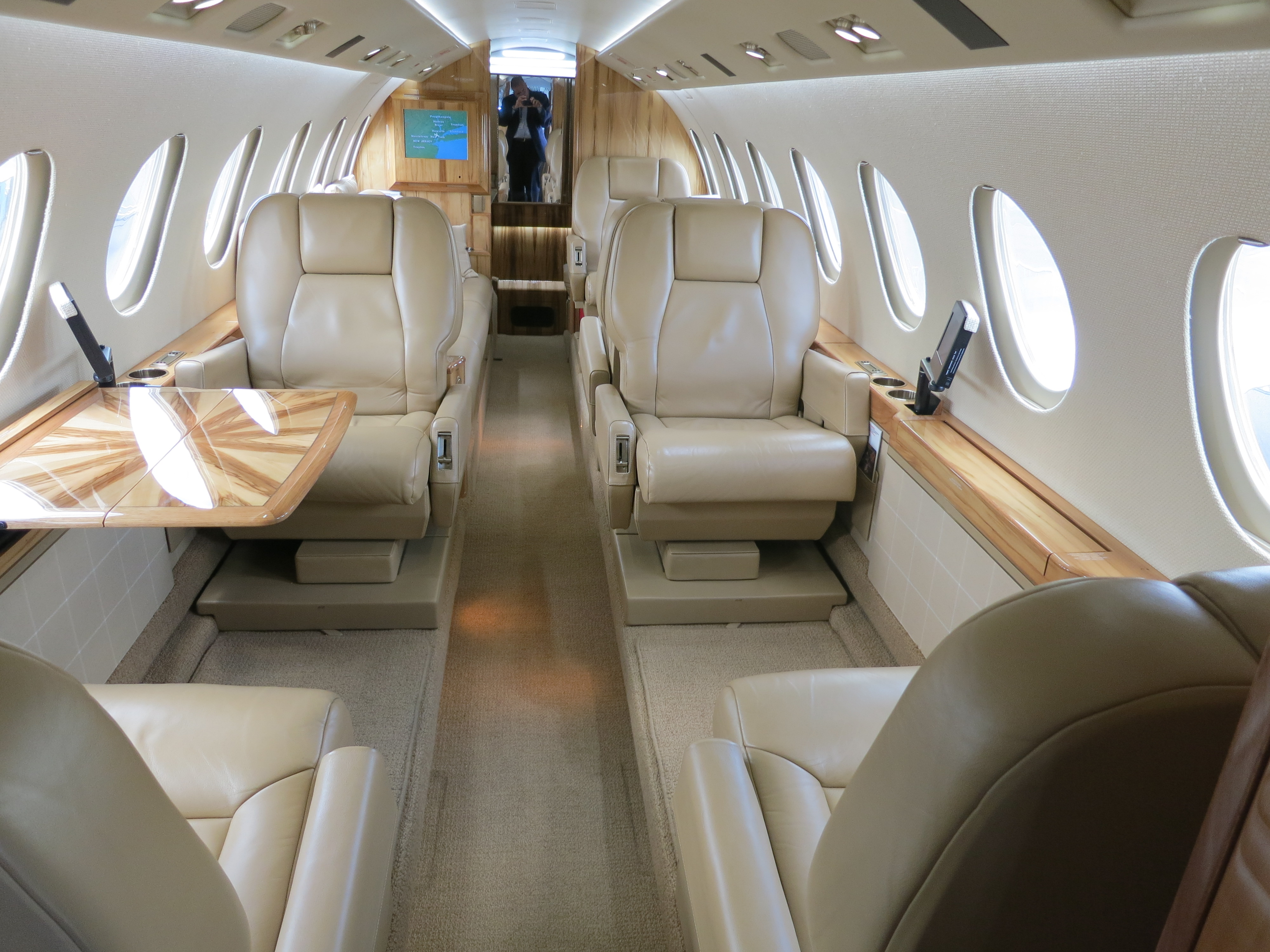
Dassault Falcon 50 cabin interior

Data from Flight International

General characteristics

- Crew: 2
- Capacity: 8 to 9 passengers / 1,080 kg (2,381 lb) payload with full fuel
- Length: 18.52 m (60 ft 9 in)
- Wingspan: 18.86 m (61 ft 11 in)
- Height: 6.98 m (22 ft 11 in)
- Wing area: 46.83 m^{2} (504.1 sq ft)
- Max takeoff weight: 18,008 kg (39,701 lb)
- Max Landing Weight: 16,200 kg (35,715 lb)
- Powerplant: 3 × Honeywell TFE 731-40 turbofan engines, 16.46 kN (3,700 lbf) thrust each

Performance

- Maximum speed: 1,015 km/h (631 mph, 548 kn)
- Maximum speed: Mach 0.95
- Cruise speed: 903 km/h (561 mph, 488 kn) / M0.85 at 15,000 m (49,000 ft)
- Range: 5,695 km (3,539 mi, 3,075 nmi)
- Service ceiling: 15,000 m (49,000 ft)
- Rate of climb: 10.433 m/s (2,053.7 ft/min)
- Take-off run: 1,504 m (4,934 ft)
- Landing run: 685 m (2,247 ft)

== See also ==
- Dassault Falcon family

Related development

- Dassault Falcon 20
- Dassault Falcon 900

Aircraft of comparable role, configuration, and era

- Bombardier Challenger 300
- Cessna Citation X
- Embraer Legacy 450/500 and Praetor 500/600
- Gulfstream G200
- Hawker 4000
- Yakovlev Yak-40

Related lists

- List of civil aircraft
