= Libyan Navy =

- القوات البحرية الليبية
- Seal of the Libyan Navy
- Active: November 1962 – present
- Country: Libya
- Allegiance: Government of National Unity (pro-GNU); House of Representatives (pro-HoR) Formerly; Government of National Accord
- Branch: Libyan Armed Forces
- Type: Navy
- Size: 15,000 personnel
- Headquarters: Tripoli (Libyan Army); Tobruk (Libyan National Army)
- Equipment: 1 frigate 26 Patrol boat 2 Auxiliary; 2 landing crafts 1 Minesweeper
- Engagements: Action in the Gulf of Sidra (1986); 2011 Libyan civil war Second Battle of Zawiya; Factional violence in Libya (2011–2014); Second Libyan Civil War; Battle of Sirte (2016); 2019-2020 Western Libya campaign

Commanders
- Commander-in Chief: Mohamed al-Menfi
- Chief of Naval Staff: Abdul Hakim Abu Hawliyeh (pro-GNU) (formerly pro-GNA); Admiral Faraj al-Mahdawi (pro-HoR)
- Notable commander: Commander Rida Issa (pro-GNU) (formerly pro-GNA)

Insignia
- Flag

- Ensign

The Libyan Navy (Arabic: قوات البحرية الليبية) is the naval warfare branch of the Libyan Armed Forces. Established in November 1962, Libyan Navy was headed by Admiral Mansour Bader, Chief of Staff of the Libyan Naval Force. Before the First Libyan Civil War, it was a fairly typical small navy for a developing third world country with a few missile frigates, corvettes and patrol boats to defend the coastline, but with a very limited self-defence capability.

The navy has always been the smallest of Libya's military branches and has always been dependent on foreign sources for equipment, spare parts, and training. Most of the Gaddafi-era fleet was destroyed in 2011. Since the start of the Second Libyan Civil War, the Libyan Navy is aligned with the Government of National Accord (GNA), led by the Presidential Council in Tripoli, apart from coastal patrol vessels under the control of the Libyan National Army.

== History ==

Its first warships were delivered in 1966. These were two Ham-class minesweepers from the UK. Initially, the effective force was limited to smaller vessels, but this changed after the rise of Colonel Muammar Gaddafi in 1969. From this time, Libya started to buy armaments from Europe and the Soviet Union. The Customs and Harbour police were amalgamated with the Navy in 1970, extending the Navy's mission to include anti-smuggling and customs duties. The total personnel of the Libyan Navy is about 8,000.

During the 2011 Libyan civil war several elements of the Libyan Navy were destroyed by NATO forces, including eight warships in the night before 20 May and one on 17 August. Two were also captured by the rebels at Benghazi.

The navy began the process of purchasing new vessels in May 2012, mainly fast patrol boats for surveillance and border protection, including the MRTP-20 fast attack boat.

As of June 2012, the Libyan Navy has been headed by Commodore Hassan Ali Bushnak, Chief of Staff of the Libyan Naval Force. The British Royal Navy along with the Libyan Navy held joint exercises at Dartmouth Naval College in the UK in June 2012.

Libyan Navy ships under the command of Rida Issa, loyal to the internationally recognized Government of National Accord, took part in the operation to liberate the city of Sirte from ISIL. The Libyan Navy assisted ground forces and blocked off sea escape routes for the militants. On 20 June 2016, the European Union states announced that the naval mission in the Mediterranean Sea, Operation Sophia, was extended until 2017, and helped train the Libyan Navy and coast guard.

In 2021, the navy (except for Haftar's forces) will be under new leadership of the new Libyan President, Mohamed al-Menfi from the Government of National Unity.

== Background ==
The Navy's primary mission is to defend the coast. A strengthening of the service was made in the 1970s; the Soviet Union sold six Foxtrot-class submarines, and though two of them were only averagely serviceable, they became the main threats to the United States Navy in the Mediterranean Sea. In the meantime, Libya bought four Russian Nanuchka-class corvettes, that even in the export versions were well-armed and powerful ships. Another four Assad-class corvettes were acquired from Italy. These had Otomat long range missiles (in the Mk.I version without datalink for in-flight course correction) and modern artillery. They were less well-armed as anti-aircraft ships than the Nanuchkas but, with a displacement almost twice that of a typical fast attack craft, had anti-submarine warfare (ASW) capabilities, with sonar and light torpedoes.

== Actions ==
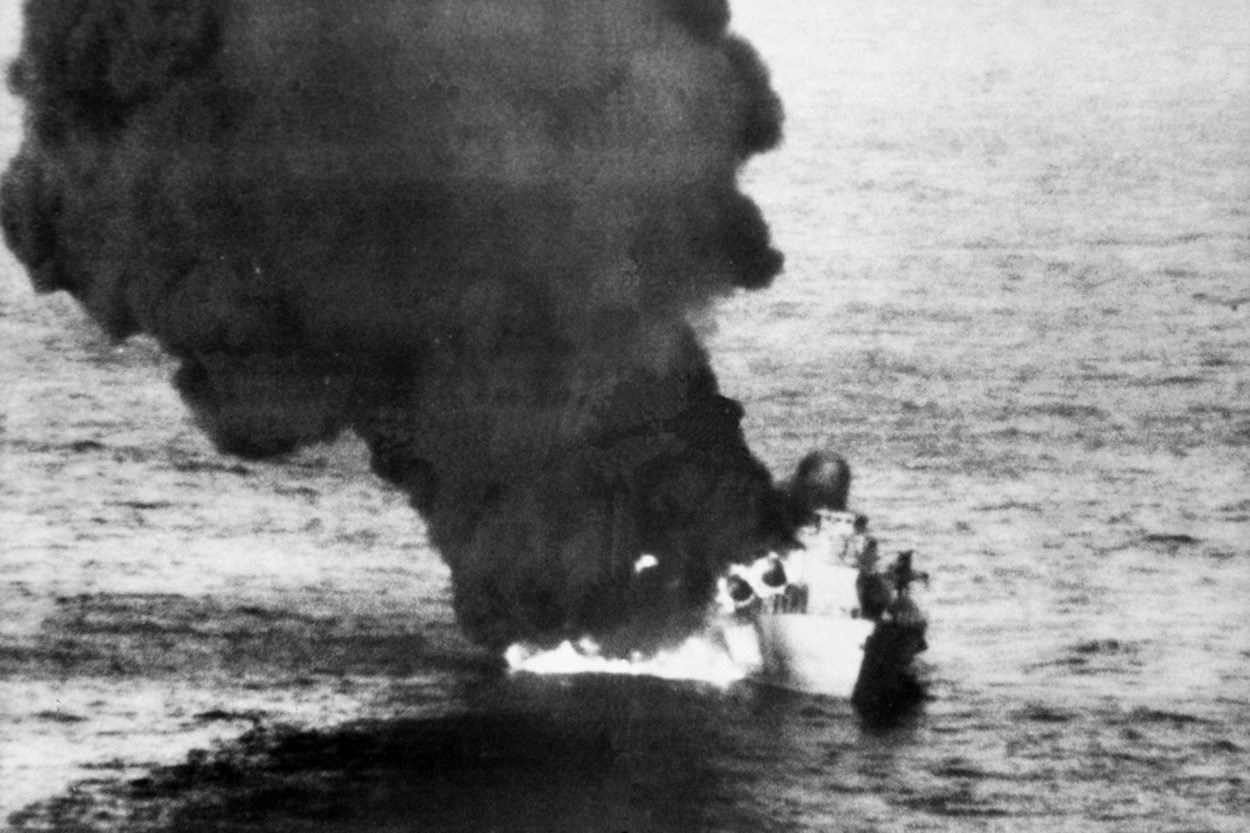
Burning Libyan corvette, 1986

Libya's Navy first saw military action during an encounter with the United States Sixth Fleet in March 1986 in the Action in the Gulf of Sidra, when one missile boat and a corvette were destroyed, and other ships were damaged by A-6 Intruder aircraft. Unusually, some of these attacks were performed successfully, with cluster bombs like the Mk.20 Rockeye which were designed as an anti-tank weapon.

In July 1984, the roll-on/roll-off ferry Ghat is believed to have mined the Red Sea a few kilometres south of the Suez Canal. Approximately nineteen ships were damaged, including a Soviet container ship which was the first to be hit on 9 July. The Islamic Jihad Organisation took responsibility for the incident. However, Egypt's President Hosni Mubarak did not believe the claims and blamed Muammar Gaddafi and Libya. Other sources agreed after it was learnt that the ship took fifteen days to complete a voyage that normally would take eight days, the head of the Libyan minelaying division was on board, and that, when inspected by French officials in Marseille the aft door was damaged. Due to concerns about the safety and potential lost revenue from the canal, Egypt asked for assistance in sweeping the mines in a complex operation that involved minehunters from the French, British, Italian, Dutch, and US navies. The British located a Soviet-made mine, which was most likely sold to Libya after 1981 and was laid to cause problems for Egypt.

Broadcast by US forces during the 2011 military intervention in Libya warning Libyan vessels of the naval blockade

Second Battle of Zawiya. Ships (1985)

== Active ships ==
According to the International Institute for Strategic Studies, a number of vessels from the Gaddafi era remain intact under both GNU (Tripoli based), and LNA (Tubruk based), although serviceability is questionable.

| Class | Type | Ships | Origin | Quantity | Notes |
Frigate
| Koni class | Frigate | Al Hani (212) | Soviet Union | 1 | Flagship of the Libyan Navy. Stationed in Malta for refit from 2013 to 2025. |
| Al karamah | Patrol vessel Corvette | al karama (416) | Ireland Uae(rebuild allegedly) Libya | 1 | in service from 2019. Mounted with one 40mm cannon and two 20mm secondary cannons |
| Shafak class | Corvette | shafak (534) (ex La Combattante III-class fast attack craft) | Libya | 1 | heavily modified to serve as a corvette by Muammar Gaddafi equipped with one Bofors L70 and 4 OTO Melara 76 mm and Otomat MK2 |
Patrol boat
| Type PV30-LS | Patrol boat | 628 Mergheb; 632 SidiBilal; 634 Sadada 636 Jelyana 638 Mersit. | Croatia | 6 | |
| Damen Stan Patrol 2606 | Patrol boat | | Netherlands | | |
| Corrubia class | Patrol boat | ubari (660) murzuq (662) houn (664) Fezzan (658) | Italy | 4 | Sent by European Union |
| FPB 110 MK2 | Patrol boat | TBZ and al Saiqa | France | 6 | |
| Safe and rescue boats | Patrol boat | al agila al rjima benini krasa | Libya Italy (possible supplier) | 4 | naval boats introduced by son of Khalifa Haftar in 2025 |
| Bigliani-class | Patrol boat | zuwarah ras ajdir zawiyah sabratha | Italy | 4 | Added by 2022 from italy |
| Rigid hull inflatable boat | | | France | 50 | operate under the 80th special amphibious assault battalion of 111th Brigade Majhfal further supported by their website |
| Alqayid-class | Pilot boat Patrol boat | 1&2 | Libya | 2 | SSA Modified civilian Turkish boat with 900HP capable of reaching 30Knot. Later given to Naval Special Forces (Libya) |
| Flex fighter-class | Fast patrol boat | TBZ (11),(12),(13),(14) | Singapore | 4 | |
Mine warfare ship
| Kulmbach-class (Hameln) | Minehunter | al kifah (206) | Germany | 1 | mysteriously appeared in Tripoli. And in 2026 visited Malta for refurbishing |
Landing craft
| Ibn ouf-class | Landing craft Landing platform helicopter | Ibn Harissa (134) ibn ouf (132) | Italy Libya | 2 | Capacity: 11 tanks or 240 troops. Revised in croatia into independent class. With Twin MTU Friedrichshafen and Two DARDO Bofors L/70 and then refitted again in 2018 in italy and added with a Helicopter landing gridthe ship are able to carry SA-316B in 2011 Helicopter grid (ibn ouf) |
| Tariq ibn ziyad | Troopship | tariq ibn ziyad | Libya | 1 | Operated by the LNA. |
| penguin landing craft | Landing Ship, Tank | TBZ (15) | Singapore | 1 | |
Auxiliary ship
| Floating Dock | Floating dry dock | | | 1 | |
| Spasilac class | Salvage tug | Al Munjed | Yugoslavia | 1 | Serviceability doubtful. |
Naval drone
| Magura | Unmanned surface vehicle | | Ukraine | Unknown likely hundreds | Has been reportedly used by Ukraine and Libyan Army to have sank 2 of the Russia's Shadow fleet |

== Former ships ==
=== Submarines ===
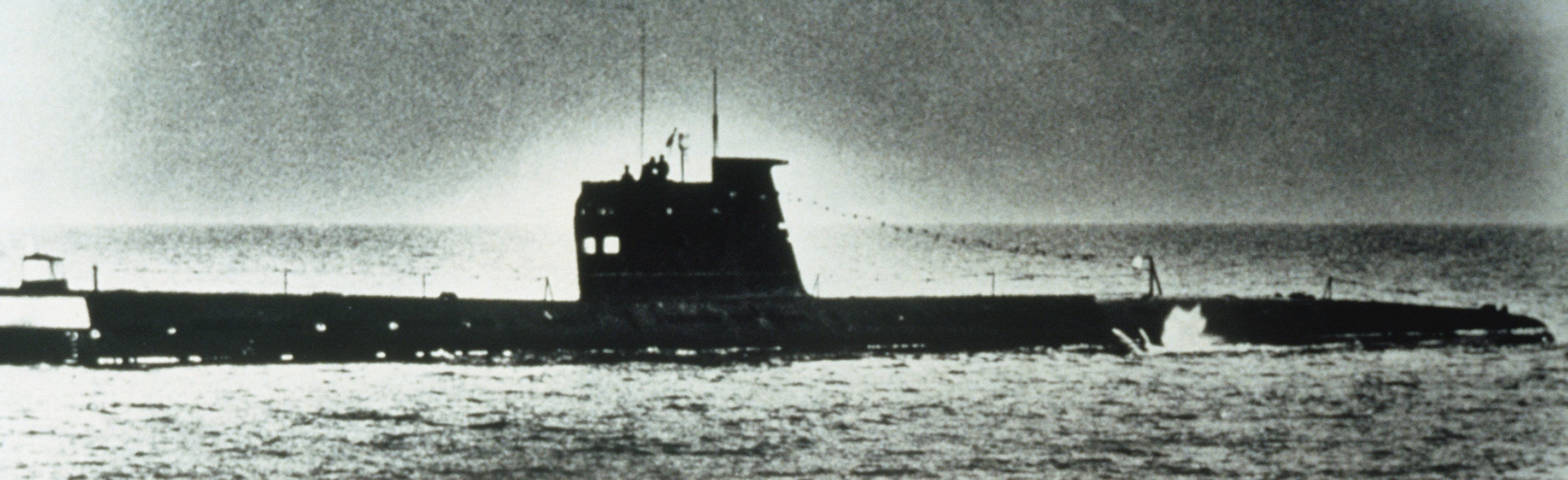
A Foxtrot-class submarine

Six obsolete Foxtrot-class submarines were transferred from the Soviet Union between 1976 and 1982. They were crewed by Soviet-trained Libyans while maintenance was done by Soviet personnel. No routine patrols were conducted since 1984. Four were decommissioned (311−314) prior to the Libyan Civil War. The Al Hunain (316) was reported to be at Tripoli in dry dock in 2003, while the Al Khyber (315) was reported as sea-going before 2011. In 2016, both Al Khyber and Al Hunain were non-operational.

=== Frigate ===
Dat Assawari (211) delivered by the United Kingdom in 1973. In 2015, it was serving as a training hulk in Tripoli.

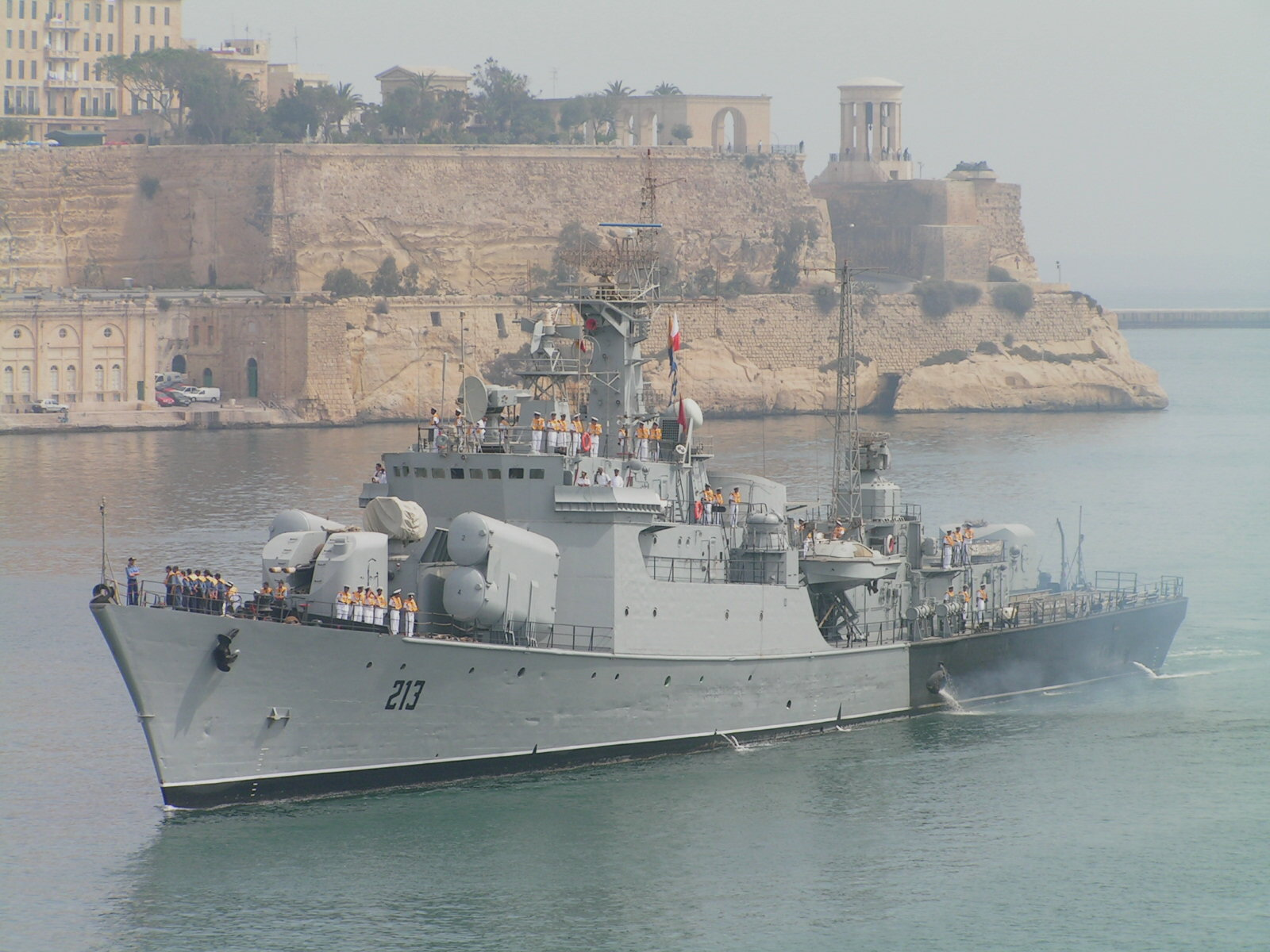
Libyan frigate Al Ghardabia in Valletta, 2005.

1 × Koni-class frigate (Type 1159)

- 213 Al Ghardabia: (struck by NATO in Tripoli Harbour 20 May 2011)

Armament:

- 4 × SS-N-2C Styx SSMs
- 2 × SA-N-4 SAMs
- 4 × 76mm guns
- 4 × 30mm guns
- 4 × 406mm torpedoes
- 1 × RBU-6000 A/S mortar
- 20 mines

Origin: Soviet Union

=== Corvette ===
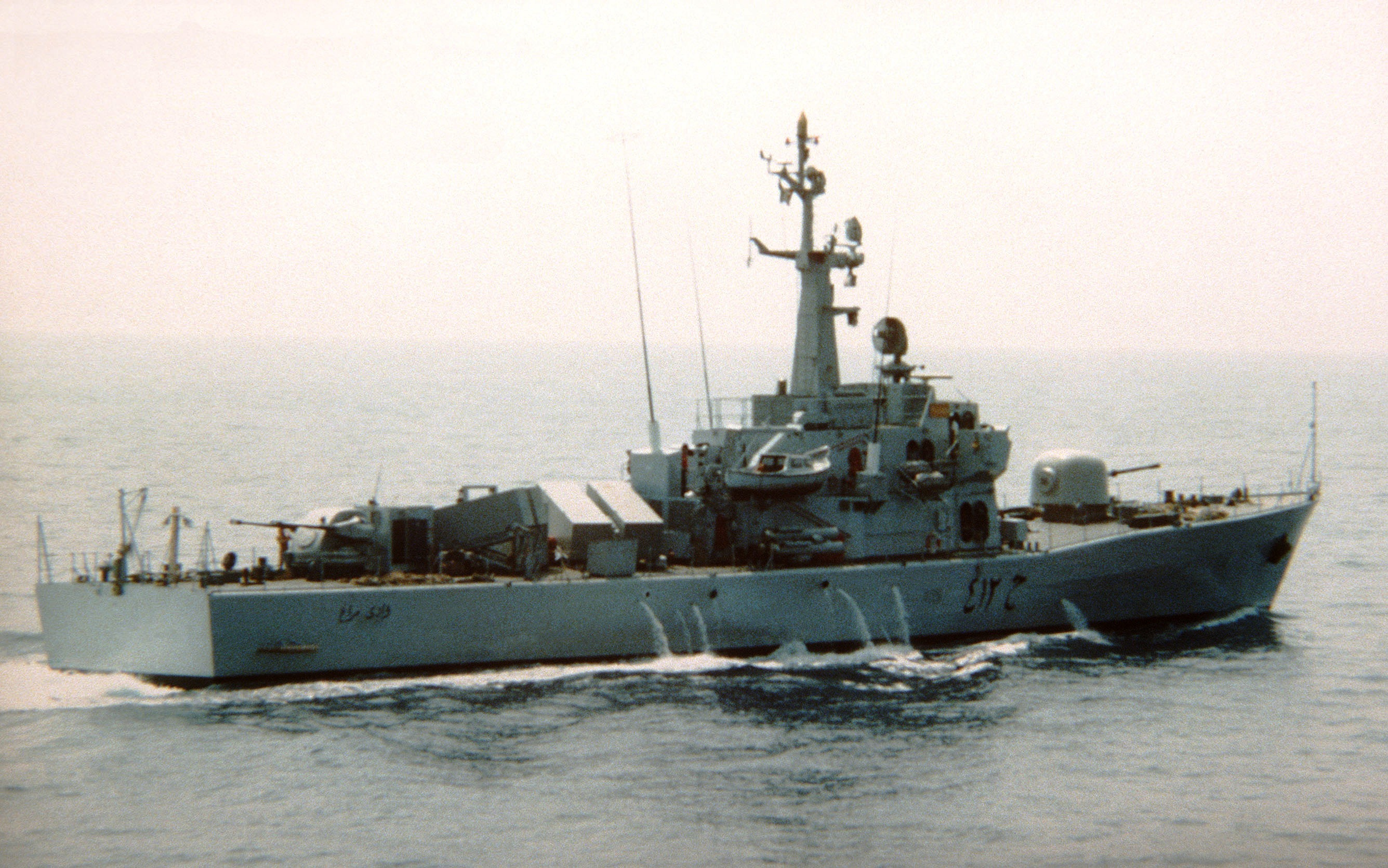
A starboard quarter view of a Libyan (Italian-built) Assad class missile corvette underway, 1982.

4 × Assad-class corvette

- Al Tadjier: (Destroyed by US Navy aircraft)
- Al Tougour: (Scrapped in 1993)
- Al Kalij: (Scrapped in 1993)
- Al Hudud: ( Scrapped in 1993)

Armament

- 1 × Otobreda 76 mm gun
- 2 × 40 mm Breda Dardo guns
- 2 × 35mm Oerlikon cannon
- 4 × Albatros Selenia Aspide SAMs
- 6 × Otomat anti-ship missiles
- 6 × ASW torpedo tubes

Origin: Italy

3 × Nanuchka-class corvette

- Ain Zaara: (Destroyed in NATO airstrike, 19 May 2011)
- Ain al Gazala: (Damaged 25 March 1986, Decommissioned and scrapped)
- Ain Zaquit: (sunk by US Navy in 1986)
- Tariq Ibn Ziyad: (Destroyed in Benghazi, 3 November 2014)

Armament

- 4 × SS-N-2C Styx SSMs
- 2 × SA-N-4 SAMs
- 2 × 57mm guns MFBPs

Origin: Soviet Union

=== Fast attack crafts ===
Received 12 Osa II missile boats from the Soviet Union between October 1976 and July 1980. In 2009, four were operational: Al Zuara (513), Al Ruha (515), Al Fikah (523) and Al Mathur (525), while eight were non-operational: Al Katum (511), Al Baida (517), Al Nabha (519), Al Safhra (521), Al Mosha (527), Al Sakab (529), Al Bitar (531) and Al Sadad (533). All were based at Tobruk. None remained in service after 2011.

9 × La Combattante II type fast attack craft (Beir Grassa class)

- 518 Sharara (ex-Beir Grassa): (Non-operational in 2011)
- 522 Shehab (ex-Beir Gzir): (Damage in May 2011 and abandoned)
- 524 Wahag (ex-Beir Gitfa):(Damage in May 2011 and abandoned)
- 526 Waheed (ex-Beir Glulud): (sunk on 24 March 1986 )
- 528 Shouaiai (ex-Beir Algandula): (Damage in May 2011 and abandoned)
- 532 Shoula (ex-Beir Ktitat): (Damage in May 2011 and abandoned)
- 536 Bark (ex-Beir Alkardmen): (Non-operational in 2011)
- 538 Rad (ex-Beir Alkur): (Damage in May 2011 and abandoned)
- 542 Laheeb (ex-Beir Alkuesat): (Damage in May 2011 and abandoned)

Armament
- 4 × (2×2) Otomat MkI SSMs
- 1 × Oto Melara 76mm gun
- 1 × Bofors twin 40mm

Origin: France

=== Minesweepers ===
6 × Natya-class minesweeper (Type 266ME)

Armament

- 4 × 30mm guns
- 4 × 25mm guns
- 4 × 25mm guns
- 10 mines
- Acoustic & Magnetic sweep

Origin: Soviet Union

2 × Ham-class minesweeper

- Zuara: (sold to Malta in 1973)
- Brak: (broken up in 1973)

Greetham was loaned from the Royal Navy to the Libyan Navy in November 1962, along with HMS Harpham. These were the first two ships in the newly formed Libyan Navy. She was transferred permanently in September 1966, and she was renamed Zuara. She was used as a coastal patrol vessel until 1973, when she was decommissioned.

Armament

- 1 × Bofors 40mm gun
- 1 × Oerlikon 20mm gun

=== Oceanographic research ship ===
1× a former trawler converted in the 1970 called Nour: (Stricken in 2002)

Armament unknown

Origin: Libya(possibly)

=== Landing ship ===
4 × Polnocny-class landing ship

Armament

- 4 × Strela 2(SA-N-5) surface-to-air missile system
- 2 × 30 mm AK-230 air defence gun
- 2 × 140 mm Ogon 18-barreled rocket launcher

Origin: Soviet Union

== Naval infrastructure ==
=== Naval bases in the 2011 Libyan civil war ===
- Khoms
- Benghazi
- Misrata
- Tobruk
- Tripoli
- Derna
- Sirte

=== Ship maintenance and repair facilities ===
Facilities at Tripoli with foreign technicians for repair of vessels of up to 6,000 tonnes deadweight (DWT); a 3,200-ton lift floating dock; floating docks at Benghazi and Tobruk.

== See also ==
- Libyan Coast Guard

== Bibliography ==
- Cordesman, Anthony H.; Nerguizian, Aram (2009). The North African Military Balance: Force Developments in the Maghreb. Center for Strategic and International Studies. ISBN 978-0-89206-552-3.
- International Institute for Strategic Studies (12 February 2024). "Chapter Six: Middle East and North Africa". The Military Balance. 124 (1): 328–395. doi:10.1080/04597222.2024.2298594. ISSN 0459-7222.
- Saunders, Stephen (2009). Jane's Fighting Ships 2009-2010. Jane's Information Group. ISBN 978-0-7106-2888-6.
- Saunders, Stephen, ed. (2015). Jane's Fighting Ships 2015-2016. Jane's Information Group. ISBN 978-0-7106-3143-5.
