= Harmony Jets Flight 185 =

2025 aviation accident in Turkey

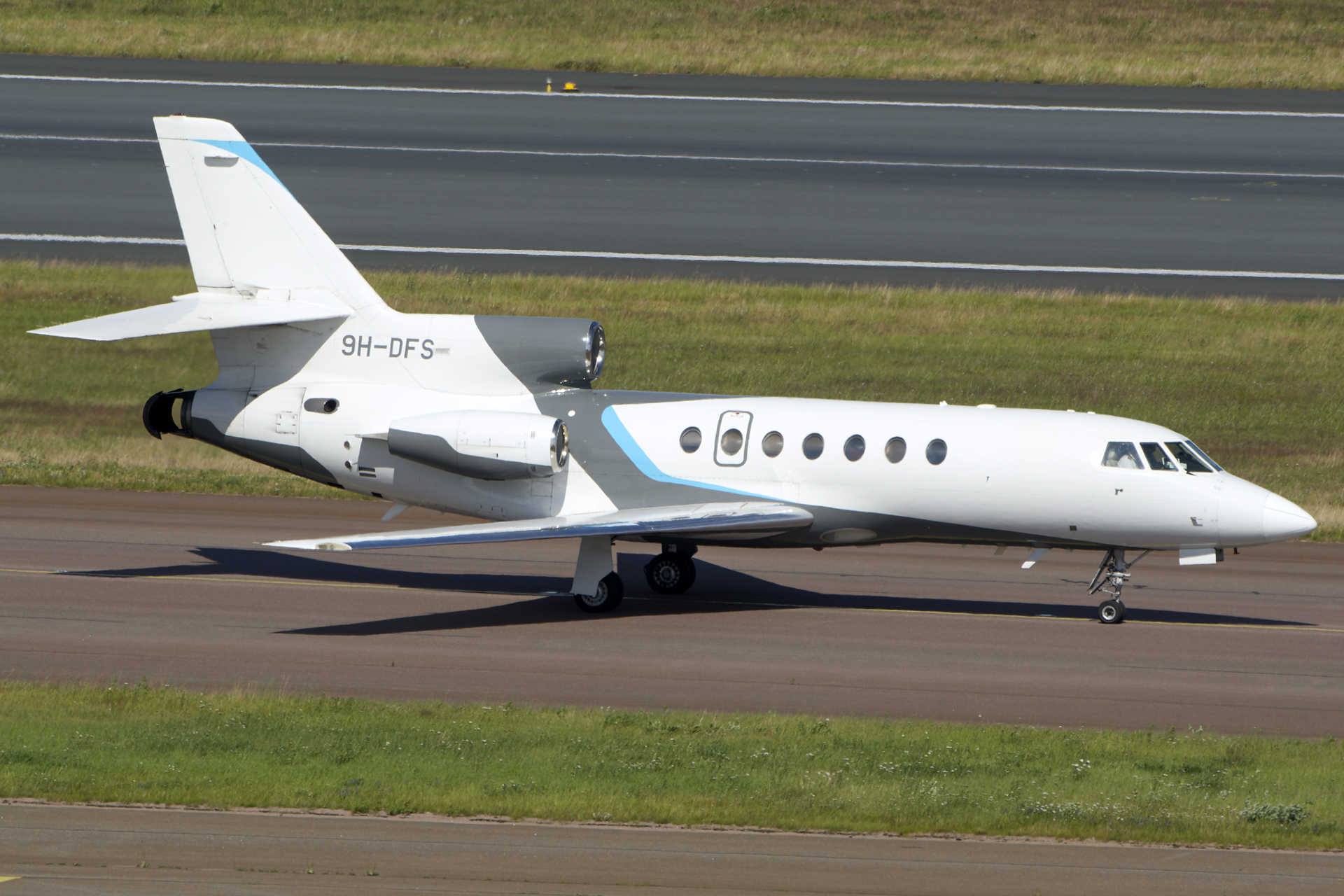
- 9H-DFS, the aircraft involved in the accident, pictured in July 2025

Accident
- Date: 23 December 2025
- Summary: Crashed shortly after takeoff; under investigation
- Site: Near Haymana, Turkey; 39.4775°N 32.7525°E

Aircraft
- Aircraft type: Dassault Falcon 50
- Operator: Harmony Jets
- ICAO flight No.: HMJ185
- Registration: 9H-DFS
- Flight origin: Ankara Esenboğa Airport, Ankara, Turkey
- Destination: Mitiga International Airport, Tripoli, Libya
- Occupants: 8
- Passengers: 5
- Crew: 3
- Fatalities: 8
- Survivors: 0

Harmony Jets Flight 185 was a charter flight from Ankara Esenboğa Airport, Turkey to Mitiga International Airport, Tripoli, Libya. On 23 December 2025, the aircraft operating the flight, a Dassault Falcon 50, crashed shortly after takeoff. The aircraft was carrying the Libyan Army chief Mohammed Ali Ahmed al-Haddad, three crew members, and four other passengers. All passengers and crew were killed.

== Background ==
=== Aircraft ===
The aircraft involved was a leased 37-year-old Dassault Falcon 50, operated by Harmony Jets and registered in Malta.

=== Passengers and crew ===
The aircraft was carrying officials returning from a trip to Ankara to discuss security cooperation between Libya and Turkey. The five passengers were identified as Libyan Army chief Mohammed Ali Ahmed al-Haddad, ground forces chief of staff Al-Fitouri Gharibil, director of the Military Manufacturing Authority Mahmoud Al-Qatawi, al-Haddad's adviser Muhammad Al-Asawi Diab and military photographer Muhammad Omar Ahmed Mahjoub. The plane was crewed by two French crew members and a Greek flight attendant.

== Crash ==
The aircraft took off from Ankara Esenboğa Airport in Ankara at 17:17 GMT, en route to Mitiga International Airport in Tripoli, Libya. At 17:32, it stopped climbing at 32,475 ft (9,898 m). A minute later, the transponder code was changed to squawk 7700 (emergency) and the crew informed air traffic control (ATC) of an electrical malfunction. The crew requested an emergency landing and were redirected back to Esenboğa Airport where preparations for a landing began. Three minutes after, the aircraft began descending before losing contact with ATC at 17:41 near the village of Babayakup, approximately two kilometres (1.2 mi) south of Haymana. A possible explosion was caught on security camera footage. Authorities discovered wreckage near the village of Kesikkavak in Haymana district. The crash site covered approximately 3 km^{2} (1.2 sq mi).

== Aftermath ==
Ankara airport was temporarily closed because of the crash, and several flights were diverted. Turkey sent a 408-member search and rescue team to the scene, and the Disaster and Emergency Management Presidency established a mobile coordination center. Recovery efforts continued the following morning after being hampered by overnight fog and rain. Specialized vehicles including tracked ambulances were deployed due to muddy terrain. The Turkish Gendarmerie General Command ultimately secured the crash site.

Harmony Jets published a press release saying they were deeply saddened and their hearts were with everyone affected. They also said they were working closely with authorities and doing everything they could to care for affected families and support team members.

Turkish president Recep Tayyip Erdoğan offered his condolences during a phone call to Libyan prime minister Abdul Hamid Dbeibeh. In Libya, the internationally recognized Government of National Unity based in Tripoli declared three days of national mourning for the crash victims, placed state flags at half-mast, and suspended official ceremonies and celebrations. Officials from the rival Government of National Stability in eastern Libya also expressed condolences, including military commander Khalifa Haftar and the House of Representatives. The Libyan Presidential Council appointed General Salah Eddine al-Namrush as interim chief of staff of the Libyan army to replace Haddad. The head of the council, Mohamed al-Menfi, posthumously promoted Haddad to the military rank of field marshal.

A military funeral for the victims was held at the Mürted Airfield Command in Ankara. The bodies of the deceased, which were stored at the Ankara Forensic Medicine Institute for identification through DNA analysis, were transported to Libya by plane accompanied by General Selçuk Bayraktaroğlu, the Chief of the Turkish General Staff. Upon arrival in Tripoli, another official memorial ceremony was held at the Ministry of Defense headquarters. The remains of the victims were then delivered to their respective hometowns for burial, with the city of Misrata declaring 28 December, the burial date for al-Haddad, Mohamed al-Essawi, and Mohamed al-Mahjoub, an official holiday. An official funeral was held at Misurata Stadium, after which private burials were held by the victims' families.

== Investigation ==
Turkish officials ruled out sabotage and said the initial cause was a technical failure after the pilot notified ATC that there was an electrical fault. Libya sent a team of 22 people, including five relatives of the victims, to Ankara to work with Turkish authorities on investigating the crash. They arrived the following day. Both the cockpit voice recorder and flight data recorder were found.

The Turkish Ministry of Justice assigned four prosecutors to investigate the crash. Transportation Minister Abdulkadir Uraloğlu said that the flight recordings would be investigated by a "neutral third country". On 26 December, it was announced that the black box would be sent to Germany; Germany later declined to conduct the investigation, and the United Kingdom was chosen instead. The French Bureau of Enquiry and Analysis for Civil Aviation Safety also said it would participate in the investigation.
