= Mohammed Ali Ahmed al-Haddad =

Libyan army general (1967–2025)

Field Marshal Mohammed al-Haddad
- محمد علي أحمد الحداد
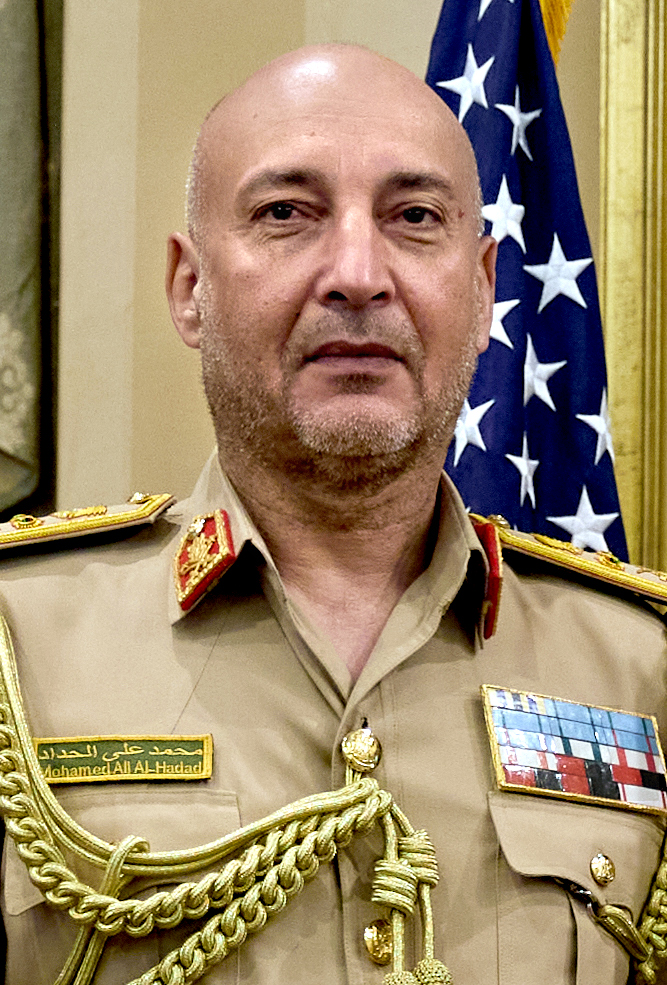
- Haddad in 2024
- Born: Mohammed Ali Ahmed al-Haddad; 1967; Misrata, Libya
- Died: 23 December 2025 (aged 57–58) near Kesikkavak, Haymana, Turkey
- Cause of death: Plane crash
- Military career
- Allegiance: Libya
- Branch: Libyan Army
- Rank: Field marshal
- Commands: Chief of the General Staff
- Conflicts: Libyan civil war (2011); Battle of Misrata (2011); Libyan civil war (2014–2020); Battle of Tripoli (2018); Western Libya campaign

Mohammed Ali Ahmed al-Haddad (Arabic: محمد علي أحمد الحداد; 1967 – 23 December 2025) was a Libyan field marshal who served as the Chief of the General Staff of the Libyan Army from 2020 until his death in a plane crash in 2025. The highest-ranking Libyan officer in the Government of National Unity (GNU), al-Haddad played a key role in efforts to reunify Libya's military. He also expanded military relations with other countries, both regionally and internationally.

== Early life and education ==
Al-Haddad was born in Misrata in 1967. He graduated from a military college in Tripoli in 1987.

== Military career ==
Al-Haddad held many positions in the Libyan Army before the first Libyan civil war broke out in 2011. In February 2011, al-Haddad defected from Muammar Gaddafi's regime and joined the rebel forces after the civil war began, fighting against Gaddafi's forces in the battle of Misrata. In 2015, he was given a senior role in the Tripoli military region. He was also a senior officer of the Halbous Brigade. Al-Haddad was appointed commander of the Central Military Region by the Libyan Presidential Council on 4 June 2017, while he held the rank of lieutenant colonel. In September, he was ordered to secure Tawergha and facilitate the return of displaced residents.

In August 2018, he was appointed to oversee ceasefire talks in Tripoli regarding the second Libyan civil war after clashes broke out in the city's south. He oversaw the army's withdrawal from areas affected by the clashes, and returned captured military bases to the forces who occupied them before fighting broke out. On 1 September, he was abducted after a military gathering, but was recovered alive in Karzaz after negotiations. In 2019, he played a role in confronting Libyan National Army forces in Tripoli during the Western Libya campaign.

=== Chief of the General Staff (2020–2025) ===
Following his promotion to lieutenant general, al-Haddad was appointed chief of staff of the Libyan Army by prime minister Fayez al-Sarraj in August 2020, officially taking office on 17 September. He became the highest-ranked officer of the internationally recognized Government of National Unity military.

From the time of his inauguration on, he vowed to end division in the military and build an army that could defend the nation's sovereignty. He led United Nations-backed talks to unify the army under the "5+5 Joint Military Committee". The military is divided under the larger context of the Libyan crisis, with a Tobruk-based rival government led by Khalifa Haftar controlling the military in eastern Libya. As part of these efforts, he met with his eastern counterpart, Abdulrazek al-Nadoori, several times in Tripoli, Cairo, and Tunisia in 2022 to discuss unification. These talks continued in 2023, with meetings between the two being held in Paris. He also helped rebuild forces in western Libya and integrated local militias into the military.

During his tenure, al-Haddad aimed to expand Libya's international military relations, especially Turkey, making visits to Ankara in 2020, 2024, and 2025. He visited a Turkish frigate stationed off Libya in August 2021, and later met with Turkish defense minister Hulusi Akar in Tripoli to widen cooperation between the two states. He traveled to Moscow that same year. In March 2023, he authorized a military pact with Italy on training Libyan special troops. He met with United States Africa Command commanders in July 2024 to discuss bolstering border security and unifying the Libyan military. He participated in talks with foreign leaders, including in Cairo and Rome, to gather support for Libya's unification and the creation of a combined European and American force to defend the country's borders.

== Death ==
On 23 December 2025, al-Haddad traveled to Ankara, where he was given a formal military ceremony upon arrival. He then held talks with Turkish chief of staff Selçuk Bayraktaroğlu.

Later that day, a Dassault Falcon 50 jet carrying al-Haddad and seven others crashed near Kesikkavak, Turkey, shortly after taking off from Ankara, killing all occupants. Libyan prime minister Abdul Hamid Dbeibeh confirmed al-Haddad's death, saying "This grave loss is a great loss for the nation, for the military institution, and for all the people." Three days of national mourning were declared by the Government of National Unity. Libyan National Army commander Khalifa Haftar also expressed condolences over his death. Al-Haddad's deputy, Salaheddine al-Namroush, was temporarily appointed to take his role.

On 27 December 2025, al-Haddad was posthumously promoted to field marshal by the president of the Libyan Presidential Council, Mohamed al-Menfi. His remains and that of the other victims were repatriated to Libya, and al-Haddad was buried in his native Misrata following official ceremonies in Ankara and Tripoli.
