= Abdel Rahman al-Taweel =

Libyan military officer

Brigadier General Abdel Rahman al-Taweel was a Libyan military officer. In September 2017, as a major general he was appointed chief of staff of Libyan Army loyal to the internationally-recognised Government of National Accord. Previously he was the head of the GNA Security Committee since January 2016. However, there were no unified armed forces under the Tripoli government's command, but various militia groups. He was replaced as the Chief of Staff of the Tripoli-based Libyan Army by Lt. Gen. Mohammed al-Shareef in February 2019. He was demoted to brigadier general and retired by Prime Minister Fayez al-Sarraj.
