= Naval Special Forces (Libya) =

Libyan Naval Special Forces
- القوات الخاصة البحرية الليبية
- Active: c. 1970s – Present
- Country: Libya
- Allegiance: Libyan Arab Jamahiriya; Libya
- Branch: Libyan Navy; Libyan Navy
- Type: Special forces Combat swimmers
- Role: Special operations
- Part of: Libyan Special Forces
- Garrison/HQ: Murrat Sidi Bilal, Tripoli
- Nickname: Human Frogs
- Engagements: Yom Kippur War; 1986 United States bombing of Libya; First Libyan Civil War; Second Libyan Civil War

Commanders
- Notable commanders: Commodore Hassan Ali Bushnak

The Libyan Naval Special Forces (Arabic: القوات الخاصة البحرية الليبية), commonly known by their colloquial name "Human Frogs" (Arabic: ضفادع بشرية, romanized: Dafadi‘ Bashariyya), are the principal special operations force of the Libyan Navy. Historically, they have been trained for a variety of missions including maritime reconnaissance, direct action, combat diving, sabotage, and counter-terrorism.

== History ==
The unit was established during the rule of Muammar Gaddafi in the 1970s, with assistance from Eastern Bloc military advisors, particularly from the Soviet Union and East Germany. Their formation was part of a broader effort to create elite units loyal to the Gaddafi regime capable of complex asymmetric and conventional warfare.

During the 2011 Libyan Civil War, the loyalties of the Naval Special Forces were fragmented. While some elements remained loyal to Gaddafi, others defected to the opposition forces.

Following the 2011 revolution and the subsequent period of instability, the Libyan state fractured, leading to the existence of multiple, competing governmental and military structures. As a result, separate units identifying as Naval Special Forces have been aligned with the various factions in the ongoing Libyan conflict, including the Government of National Unity in Tripoli and the forces aligned with Khalifa Haftar's Libyan National Army (LNA) in the east.

== Capabilities and Training ==
The initial training regimen for the "Human Frogs" was heavily influenced by Soviet-style spetsnaz and combat diving programs. Training has historically focused on proficiency in using rebreathers and other diving apparatus for stealthy underwater infiltration and exfiltration.

The Naval Special Forces' capabilities include advanced infantry doctrine and techniques for the planning and execution of raids and assault operations, emphasizing coordinated maneuver, mission planning, and unit-level discipline, controlled employment and safe handling of explosive charges and associated munitions for the deliberate neutralization or denial of port infrastructure, vessels, and other critical facilities, conducted in accordance with applicable legal, safety, and command protocols.

It also established procedures and legal‑operational frameworks governing the boarding, inspection, securing, and, where authorized, seizure of maritime vessels to ensure compliance with applicable law and achievement of mission objectives.

The CIA in 1984 reported in a research paper that "the frogmen receive training in underwater demolition and long-distance swimming. They pose a serious threat to moored shipping and also can conduct sabotage ashore. [...] They are well trained and professional Zodiac rubber rafts, probably two-man mini-submarines, and other swimmer-delivery vehicles are available to assist them on their final approach to the target."

Following the fall of the Gaddafi government, the training and equipment of the various factions' naval forces have become inconsistent, often dependent on external state sponsors.

== Equipment ==
The equipment used by the unit has varied over time and between the different factions. In the Jamahiriyah era, they were equipped with Soviet-era small arms, such as the AK-74 assault rifle and the AKS-74U carbine, they would later have Western-made submachine guns like the HK MP5 & FN P90. Their diving equipment and rebreathers also originated from Soviet and Eastern European suppliers.

Modern iterations of the force have been observed with a mix of Soviet-era and modern Western small arms, including M4 carbines and AK-103 assault rifles, supplied through various channels during the civil conflicts.

== See also ==
- Libyan Navy
- Libyan Special Forces
- Special forces
- Frogman
