= FPB 110 PCG class =

Series of forty patrol boats

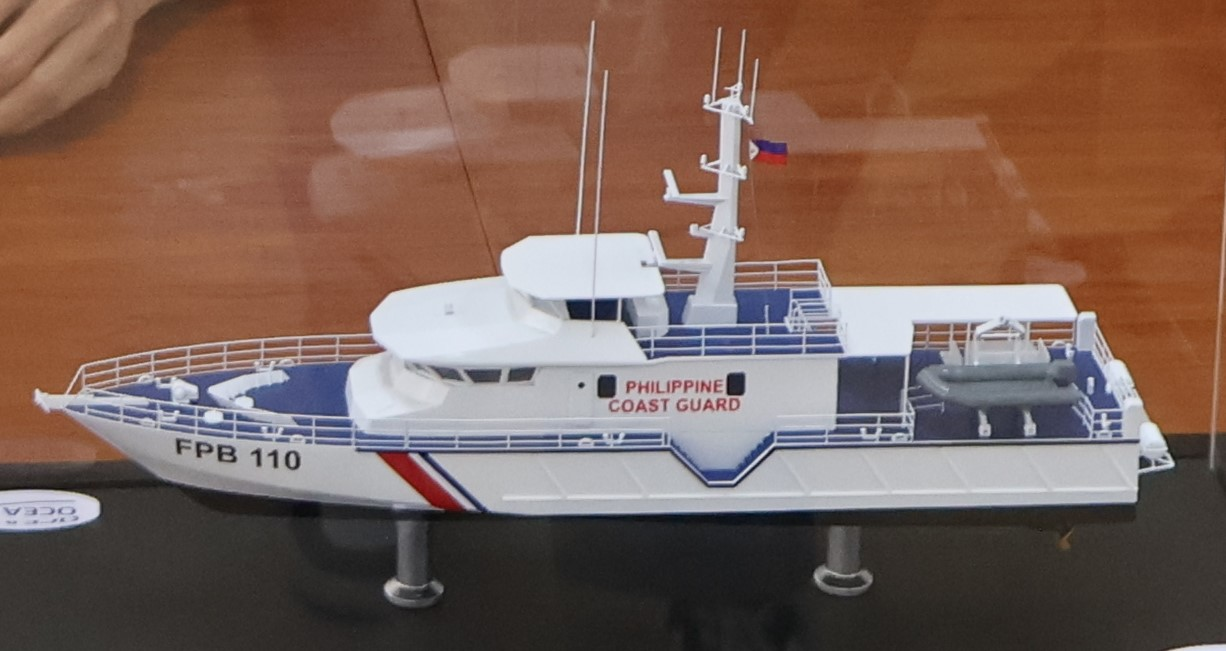
- Scale model of proposed PCG FPB110 MK2

Class overview
- Builders: OCEA Shipbuilding, France
- Operators: Philippine Coast Guard
- Cost: EUR 406,440,000 / PHP 22,992,310,800
- Planned: 40
- Completed: 0
- Active: 0

General characteristics
- Type: Patrol boat
- Length: 35 m (114 ft 10 in)
- Speed: 30 knots (56 km/h; 35 mph)
- Range: 1,100 nmi (2,000 km; 1,300 mi) at 12 knots (22 km/h; 14 mph)
- Complement: 21

The PCG OCEA FPB 110 MKII-class patrol boat is a class of forty patrol boats to be built by OCEA of France for the Philippine Coast Guard based on the FPB 110 design.

The Department of Transportation issued a Notice of Award to OCEA S.A. of France worth EUR 406,440,000.00 dated 20 May 2025.

The contract includes 9 year maintenance instead of the usual 2 years and dockside equipment for six PCG bases.

The country’s maritime sector marked another milestone as French Ambassador to the Philippines Marie Fontanel and Transportation Secretary Vince Dizon, with Philippine Coast Guard Commandant Admiral Ronnie Gil Gavan and Mr. Roland Joassard, Chief Executive Officer of leading French shipbuilder, OCEA S.A. signed the contract for the acquisition of 40 units of 35-meter Fast Patrol Craft (FPC) as part of the PCG Modernization Program.

The acquisition is in line with President Bongbong Marcos's directive to upgrade PCG’s maritime security and operational capabilities.

Supported by a government-to-government financing agreement under the Agreement on Financial and Development Cooperation (AFDC), the project will also reinforce the strong ties between the Philippines and France in the field of maritime safety and development. May 22, 2025.

The acquisition of 40 fast patrol crafts is the largest single-purchase for the modernization of the Coast Guard.

Some of the vessels will be deployed to the West Philippine Sea (WPS) as part of the PCG’s “mix of capabilities” to address security threats in Philippine waters, Gavan said.

The vessels are expected to enhance the drive against smuggling, drug trafficking, piracy, illegal fishing, and other forms of maritime crime.

“All forms of maritime crimes because enforcement of laws require us to be there. So, we need boats. This will also be engaged in search and rescue, and environmental protection and surveillance operations,” Gavan said.
