= Ministry of Defence (Libya) =

Ministry of Defense
- وزارة الدفاع
- Coat of arms of Libya

Agency overview
- Formed: 24 December 1951
- Jurisdiction: Government of National Unity
- Headquarters: Tripoli
- Annual budget: 3.5 billion LYD (2013)
- Minister responsible: Abdul Hamid Dbeibeh
- Website: Official website

The Ministry of Defense is the ministry of the Government of National Unity of Libya responsible for the Libyan Armed Forces and manages the country's internal security and defense affairs.

== History ==
=== Gaddafi era ===
On 14 October 1990, the General People's Committee for Defence was created by order Resolution No. 22 of the Supreme Commander of the Libyan military, Colonel Muammar Gaddafi. In 1991, the Defence Ministry ceased to exist, with Abu-Bakr Yunis Jabr continuing as Secretary of the Libyan General Committee for Defence and Commander-in-Chief of the Libyan Army.

== Modern ministry ==
=== Agencies and entities ===
- Military Judicial Authority
- Military Industry Authority
- Military Medical Authority
- Applied Studies and Development Authority
- Military Inspection Authority
- Services and Maintenance Center
- LMAC

=== Think Tanks ===
- "Al-Salam" Center for Strategic Studies
- “Libya” Center for Strategic Studies
- Libyan Center for Advanced Industries

=== Administrations And Offices ===
- Minister’s Office
- Legal Affairs Office
- Intel Office
- Internal Auditing Office
- International Cooperation Office
- Human Rights Office
- Media Office
- Monitoring Office
- Delegates Offices
- Administration of Strategic Planning
- Administration of Military Intel
- Administration of Military Affairs
- Administration of Administrative Affairs
- Administration of Human Resource
- Administration of Military Protocol
- Administration of Military Medical Services
- Administration of Financial Affairs
- Administration of Military Accounts
- Administration of Military Procurement
- Administration of Production

== See also ==
- Cabinet of Libya
