= Libyan Army =

Military forces in Libya

The Libyan Army
- الجيش الليبي
- Libyan Army Flag
- Active: 1951 (Cyrenaica Liberation Army); 2016 (current form, under the Government of National Unity); Rival government: 2014 (Libyan National Army under the Government of National Stability)
- Country: Libya
- Allegiance: Government of National Unity; Presidential Council; Formerly: Government of National Accord
- Type: Army
- Role: Land warfare
- Part of: Libyan Armed Forces
- Garrison/HQ: Tripoli
- Colors: Black, red
- Anniversaries: 9 August

Commanders
- Commander-in Chief: Mohamed al-Menfi (GNU)
- Chief of General Staff: Salaheddine al-Namroush (acting)

The Libyan Army (الجيش الليبي) is the ground force composed of a number of separate regular and irregular military formations in Libya, which were under the command of the internationally recognised Government of National Accord (GNA), now the Government of National Unity (GNU).

Since December 2015 the groups of the Libyan Army has been nominally subordinated to the internationally recognised Government of National Accord (GNA) based in Tripoli. Due to the instability in the country in 2011 civil war and the outbreak of a new conflict in 2014, the Libyan ground forces remain structurally divided, with components constituting the Tobruk-based Libyan National Army (LNA) under the command of Khalifa Haftar. The forces loyal to the GNA have been fighting against various other factions in Libya, including the Islamic State. Some efforts have been made to create a truly national army, but most of the forces under the Tripoli government's command consist of various militia groups, such as the Tripoli Protection Force, and local factions from cities like Misrata and Zintan.

== Background ==
Since the outbreak of the Libyan civil war in 2011, the unified pre-war Gaddafi's armed forces dissolved. The pre-war Libyan Army (Arabic: رئاسة الأركان العامة للجيش الليبي) no longer exists.

The Libyan Armed Forces dissolved in the course of the first Libyan civil war from 2011, and after the second civil war, armed groups in Libya are generally divided between the Government of National Accord (GNA) based in Tripoli, which has a collection of militias, and Khalifa Haftar's "Libyan National Army" in and around Benghazi.

GNA forces have been fighting against various other factions in Libya, including the Islamic State. Most of the forces under the Tripoli government's command consist of various militia groups, such as the Tripoli Protection Force, and local factions from cities like Misrata and Zintan.

== Factions ==
Libya is divided between the GNA in the west; the LNA in the east; and other factions. The Libyan National Army (LNA) evolved following the fall of Muammar Gaddafi. In 2014, the LNA came under the control of Khalifa Haftar and the House of Representatives, whose geographical location is in the eastern Libyan city of Tobruk.

In 2017, there was no truly unified army or air force under the Presidential Council's command, and only the Libyan Navy was fully operating under the GNA's control. The Tripoli government aimed to integrate many different militia groups into a regular command structure, and created a Presidential Guard. Prime Minister Sarraj hold the role of supreme commander of the army. The Libyan Army is commanded by the GNA Defense Ministry, which was initially led by Colonel Al-Mahdi Al-Barghathi from 2016 until he was removed in July 2018, at which point GNA Prime Minister Fayez al-Sarraj took on the role of defense minister. The Chief of the General Staff was Major General Abdel Rahman al-Taweel, from September 2017 until his removal in February 2019, being replaced by Lieutenant General Mohammed al-Shareef.

=== 2017–2018 ===
Since the establishment of the Government of National Accord in 2016 clashes continued to occur between different factions in Tripoli nominally loyal to the new UN-backed unity government, leaving hundreds dead. Khalifa al-Ghawil proclaimed the creation of a new government consisting of the former General National Congress. Elements of the Presidential Guard defected to the rebels and took over key buildings in the capital. Pro-GNA forces eventually were able to defeat the GNC coup attempt. Around mid-2017, militias allied to the GNA fully secured the capital. In August 2018 fighting broke out between different groups in Tripoli that were all nominally subordinated to the GNA's defense ministry, forcing Prime Minister Sarraj to call in other militias from different towns outside the capital. A unit called the 7th Brigade had rebelled, leading to its dissolution.

=== 2019 ===
On 6 April 2019, a joint operations room was formed in response to Khalifa Haftar's attack on Tripoli to coordinate their military forces. It is led by Western military zone commander Osama al-Juwaili and includes the heads of the Tripoli and Central military zones, the Counter-Terrorism Force, and representatives from the Presidential Guard and Military Intelligence Bureau.

In response to a common interest in defending Tripoli against the LNA, the armed militias that in mid 2019 composed the armed forces of the GNA coordinated with one another mainly by agreement among armed group commanders rather than by the official command structure. The militias remained mostly autonomous in decision-making while formally being integrated into the GNA chain of command. Lacher Wolfram, writing in a Security Assessment in North Africa publication, described this as "bottom-up integration" and a "remarkable development" that "could potentially serve as a starting point for the creation of properly integrated forces ... [with] loyalty to a unified command structure".

=== Military zones ===
On 1 June 2017, the GNA announced the creation of seven military zones throughout Libya. They include Tripoli, Benghazi, Tobruk, Sabha (Southern), Kufra, Central (from Misrata to Zuwetina), and Western (west of Tripoli to Jebel Nafusa) . The commanders of each zone were responsible for training and preparation of the forces in their area and answered to the Libyan army chief of staff. Not all of the territories accounted for were under the GNA's control at the time.

The leaders of the military zones are as follows.

- Tripoli: Maj. Gen. Abdel Basset Marwan (from 14 March 2018) – Militia leader from Tripoli.
- Western: Maj. Gen. Osama al-Juwaili (from 4 June 2017) – Zintan military council leader.
- Central: Maj. Gen. Mohammed Ali Ahmed al-Haddad (from 4 June 2017) – Halbous Brigade leader from Misrata.
- Southern (Sabha): Ali Kanna (from 6 February 2019) – Tuareg militia leader.

=== Known units ===
- Tripoli Protection Force
- Shura Council of Benghazi Revolutionaries
- Libya Shield Force
- Petroleum Facilities Guard
- Tuareg militias in Fezzan
- Tripoli Revolutionaries Brigade
- Abu Saleem Central Security Force
- Omar Mukhtar force: 2000 Syrian National Army mercenaries funded at US$2,000 per month arriving in December 2019/January 2020; 650 arrived in Libya by 29 December and deployed to frontline positions in East Tripoli.
- Turkish military advisory personnel: 35 as of 15 January 2020

== Structure ==
=== Department ===
- Regulatory and Administrative Authority
- Supply and Logistics Authority
- Communications Management
- Engineering Management
- Military Intelligence Directorate
- Military Police Department
- Armament and Ammunition Management
- Chemical Warfare Management
- military medical corps
- Moral Guidance Department

=== Combat Unit ===
- unit under the direct command of the General Staff and Ministry of Defence.
  - 444th Combat Brigade
    - 1st Battalion
    - 2nd Battalion
    - 3rd Battalion
    - 124th Airborne Battalion
  - 111th Brigade Majhfal
    - 80th Special Operations Battalion

Sources

- Tripoli Military Region
  - 217th Infantry Battalion
  - 51st Brigade
    - 314th Tank Battalion
    - 310th Battalion
    - protection company
    - artillery battalion
  - Tripoli Military Police

Sources

- Western Coast Military Region
  - 52nd Infantry Brigade
  - 62nd Brigade
  - 103rd Infantry Brigade
  - 33rd Special Operations Battalion
  - 22nd Thunderbolt Battalion
  - 138th Infantry Battalion
  - 135th Infantry Battalion

Sources:

- Central Military Region
  - 53rd Brigade
    - 1st Reserve Battalions
    - 2nd Reserve Battalions
  - 63rd Brigade

Sources:

- Western Mountain Military Region
  - 12th Brigade
  - 4th Infantry Brigade

== Allies ==
One of the GNA's main allies is Turkey. Turkey had deployed weapons and equipment to GNA troops even before the Government of National Accord (GNA) requested Turkish military support in December 2019. Turkey's engagement for the GNA is linked to its broader strategic interests in the Eastern Mediterranean: in November, Turkey and GNA leader Fayez al-Sarraj signed a defense cooperation deal. At the same time GNA and Turkey agreed one on maritime boundaries in the Eastern Mediterranean, where Turkey is locked in a dispute with regional rivals Greece, Cyprus, Egypt and Israel over access to sea regions rich in natural gas.

== Equipment ==
=== Weapons ===
Model	image	type	Calibre	Quantity	Origin	Notes
Pistol
TT-33		Semi-automatic pistol	7.62×25mm Tokarev		Soviet Union	
Makarov PM		Semi-automatic pistol	9×18mm Makarov		Soviet Union	
Browning Hi-Power		Semi-automatic pistol	9×19mm Parabellum		Belgium; United States	
Glock 17		Automatic Pistol	9×19mm Parabellum		Austria	
SAR 9		Semi-automatic pistol	9×19mm Parabellum		Turkey	
Caracal F		Semi-automatic pistol	9x19mm Parabellum		United Arab Emirates	Purchased and issued to the Ministry of Interior of Libya staff.
Submachine gun
Heckler & Koch MP5		Submachine gun	9×19mm Parabellum		West Germany	
FN P90		Submachine gun	FN 5.7×28mm		Belgium	
Shotgun
Benelli M4 Super 90		Semi-automatic shotgun	12 gauge	1800	Italy	An order were delivered prior of the start of the Libyan revolution of 2011, later used by Libyan special forces.
Winchester Model 1200		Pump-action shotgun	12 gauge		United States	
Battle rifle and assault rifle
MPT-55		Assault rifle	5.56×45mm NATO		Turkey	MPT-55K assault rifles supplied by Turkey.
Heckler & Koch G3		Battle rifle	7.62×51mm NATO		West Germany; Turkey	
M4A1		Carbine	5.56×45mm NATO		United States	
M16		Assault rifle	5.56×45mm NATO		United States	
Heckler & Koch G36		Assault rifle	5.56×45mm NATO	600	Germany	G36 (variants KV and E) were legally sold from Egypt in 2003, presumably used by the Khamis Brigade/Special Forces (although this remains unclear), anti-Gaddafi forces, most notably the Tripoli Brigade, would later capture an unknown number of stockpiled G36 from the Bab al-Azizia armory.
AK-47		Assault rifle	7.62×39mm		Soviet Union	
AKM		Assault rifle	7.62×39mm		Soviet Union	
AK-103		Assault rifle	7.62×39mm		Russia	Libyan military stock.
PM md. 63		Assault rifle	7.62×39mm		Romania	
Zastava M70		Assault rifle	7.62×39mm		Yugoslavia	
Norinco CQ		Assault rifle	5.56×45mm NATO		China	Chinese unlicensed copy of M16 rifle, used by the National Liberation Army.
Type 65		Assault rifle	5.56×45mm NATO		Taiwan	Taiwanese copy of the M16 rifle
Beretta AR70/90		Assault rifle	5.56×45mm NATO		Italy	
FN F2000		Bullpup assault rifle	5.56×45mm NATO	367	Belgium	Purchased from FN Herstal in 2008, delivery commenced in 2009, during the Libyan Civil War of 2011, Libyan rebels captured an unknown number of F2000 from Gaddafi loyalists.
FN FAL		Battle rifle	7.62×51mm NATO		Belgium	
Kale KCR		Assault rifle	7.62×51mm NATO		Turkey	supplied to GNU
Sniper rifle
Barrett M82		Anti-materiel rifle	.50 BMG		United States	
SVD Dragunov		Sniper rifle	7.62×54mmR		Soviet Union	
PSL		Sniper rifle	7.62×54mmR		Romania	Libyan military stock.
Machine gun
PK		General-purpose machine gun	7.62×54mmR		Soviet Union	
RPK		Light machine gun	7.62×39mm		Soviet Union	
RPD		Light machine gun	7.62×39mm		Soviet Union	
FN Minimi		Light machine gun	5.56×45mm NATO		Belgium	
FN MAG		General-purpose machine gun	7.62×51mm NATO		Belgium	
M2 Browning		Heavy machine gun	.50 BMG		United States	
DShK		Heavy machine gun	12.7×108mm		Soviet Union	
Grenade-based weapon
GM-94		Pump-action grenade launcher	43×30mm		Russia	Used by anti-Gaddafi forces.
Daewoo K4		Automatic grenade launcher	40×53mm		South Korea	First export customer
Anti-tank weapons
RPG-7		Rocket-propelled grenade launcher	40 mm		Soviet Union	Libyan military stock.
M40		Recoilless rifle	105 mm		United States	US, Chinese and Iran made variants used.
SPG-9		Recoilless rifle	73 mm smoothbore		Soviet Union	
9M14 Malyutka		Anti-tank guided missile	125 mm		Soviet Union	
9K115 Metis		Anti-tank guided missile	94 mm		Soviet Union	Supplied by Turkey to the GNA.
MILAN		Anti-tank guided missile	115 mm		France; West Germany	Supplied by Qatar during the 2011 Libyan Civil War.
FGM-148 Javelin		Anti-tank guided missile	127 mm		United States	captured from LNA
Dehlavieh		Anti tank guided missile	160 mm		Iran	supplied from Iran

=== Artillery ===
Name	Image	Type	Origin	Quantity	Notes
Tactical ballistic missile
Scud-B		R-17	Soviet Union	6	Refurbished and used by 111th Brigade Majhfal
TRG-300		Hurricane	Turkey	4~	
Rocket artillery
Type 63 multiple rocket launcher		107mm MLRS	China	100+	Libyan military stock.
BM-21 Grad		122mm MLRS	Soviet Union	40+	Libyan military stock.
T-122 Sakarya		122mm MLRS	Turkey	20+	Supplied by Turkey
Self-propelled howitzer
2S1 Gvozdika		122mm	Soviet Union	20+	Libyan military stock.
Palmaria		155mm	Italy	50+	Libyan military stock.
T-155 Fırtına		155mm	Turkey; South Korea	7+	Supplied by Turkey.
Towed howitzer
M114		155mm	United States		Donated to the Libyan Army by Turkey.
D-30		122mm	Soviet Union	20+	Libyan military stock.
M-46		130mm	Soviet Union	60	Libyan military stock.
MKE Boran		105mm	Turkey		Sent by turkey
Mortar
M1938		120mm	Soviet Union	Unknown	Libyan military stock.
QT-7		122mm	Libya	1	Observed in 2026
Anti-aircraft systems
ZPU		14.5mm Anti-aircraft gun	Soviet Union		Libyan military stock. Mounted on technicals.
ZU-23-2		23mm Anti-aircraft gun	Soviet Union		Mounted on technicals.
ZSU-23-4		23mm Self-propelled anti-aircraft gun	Soviet Union		Libyan military stock.
KORKUT		35mm Self-propelled anti-aircraft gun	Turkey		Supplied by Turkey.
QW-13		Man-portable air-defense system	China		
QW-18		Man-portable Air-defence system	China Thailand	large numbers	
S-125-2DM1		Medium range Surface to air missile	UkraineLibya	10	
MIM-23 Hawk		Medium-range Surface-to-air missile system	United States		Supplied by Turkey.
Hisar O+		Medium-range Surface-to-air missile system	Turkey	2+	Supplied by Turkey to replace MIM-23 Hawk.
S-200		Long Range Air defence system	Russia Libya	3	modified to detect drones
IHTAR		Surface-Portable anti Unnamned aircraft defend system	Turkey Libya	Large amount.	Supplied By turkey but turned into a portable moving system mounted on toyota.

=== Radars ===
Model	Origin	Image	Type	Quantity	Notes
AN/MPQ-64 Sentinel	United States		Air search radar	Unknown	
Kalkan (radar)	Turkey		Air search radar	unknown	

=== Electronic warfare and Command systems ===
Name	Image	Origin	Type	Quantity	Notes
Aselsan KORAL		Turkey	Electronic Warfare	Unknown	Supplied by Turkey to the Government of National Unity (GNU) forces. Used for ground-based radar jamming, electronic attack, and suppression of enemy air defenses (SEAD). Identified in UN Security Council Panel of Experts reporting.
GÖBERK anti drone system		Turkey	Directed-energy weapon		
MILKAR-3A3		Turkey	Electronic jamming	unknown	reported 2026
Rohde & Schwarz EW/SIGINT		Germany	Mobile Radio Monitoring & Jamming System	Unknown	Tactical radio frequency monitoring, direction finding (DF), and signals intelligence suites. Primarily utilized for communications intercept and electronic support.

=== Vehicles ===
Model	Image	Origin	Variant	Number	Details
Main battle tanks
T-54/T-55		Soviet Union; Egypt	T-55A; T-55E	60+	Libyan military stock.
T-62		Soviet Union; Russia	T-62M; T-62MV	30+	Libyan military stock.
T-72		Soviet Union	T-72; T-72M1	20+	Libyan military stock.
M60 Patton		United States; Turkey	M60A1	3	Supplied by Turkey.
M60A3		United States Turkey	M60A3	Large numbers	supplied in large amounts by Turkey
M60T (Sabre MK2)		Turkey	Sabre Mk2	7	supplied by Turkey
Infantry fighting vehicles
BMP-1		Soviet Union			Libyan military stock.
BMP-2		Soviet Union			
Ratel IFV		Republic of South Africa (1961–1994)	Ratel 20; Ratel 60	2	Captured from the LNA.
Armored cars
EE-9 Cascavel		Military dictatorship in Brazil		10+	Libyan military stocks.
Armoured personnel carriers
FNSS ACV-15		Turkey	ACV-AAPC		Purchased from Turkey.
Steyr 4K-7FA		Austria			
Mbombe 6		South Africa			
KADDB Al-Wahsh		Jordan		5+	Captured from the LNA.
BMC Kirpi		Turkey	Kirpi II		Purchased from Turkey.
BMC Amazon		Turkey		30~	
BMC Vuran		Turkey			Purchased from Turkey.
Lenco BearCat		United States	G3		
Nimr		United Arab Emirates	Ajban	10+	Captured from the LNA.
STREIT Group Cougar		United Arab Emirates / Canada}		?	Captured from LNA.
STREIT Group Spartan		United Arab Emirates / Canada		?	Captured from LNA.
Panthera T6		United Arab Emirates		3	Captured from the LNA.
Panthera F9		United Arab Emirates / Turkey		1	Captured from the LNA.
HMMWV		United States		30+	Part of a batch of 200 vehicles sent by the US to Libya in 2012. Some were captured from the LNA.
KJ4-8		Libya		?	manufactured by the company of Black horse based on Misrata
CAN-1		Libya		less than 100	Manufactured by black horse as new series
Military engineering vehicles
Centurion AVRE		United Kingdom	AVRE 105		
Tank destroyers
9P157-2 Khrizantema-S		Russia			
Trucks
Toyota Land Cruiser		Japan	HZJ 79		Used as technicals.
Toyota 70 series		Japan	LC-70 to LC-79	157	used as Technicals
Toyota Land Cruiser (J250)		Japan	LC-300	86	armoured and used as an APC
Iveco Trakker		Italy	Trakker 380	40+	
KAMAZ		Russia	?	2	Captured from the LNA.
MAN SX		Germany	SX45		supplied by Turkey
