= 111th Brigade Majhfal =

- اللواء 111 محفل
- Country: Libya
- Allegiance: Ministry of Defence (Libya), Government of National Unity (Libya)
- Branch: Libyan Army
- Type: Infantry
- Part of: Tripoli Military Region
- Garrison/HQ: Camp Hamza, Tripoli
- Engagements: 2025 Tripoli clashes
- Website: https://www.facebook.com/Brigade111Ly

Commanders
- Current commander: Abdul Salam Zobi

The 111th Brigade Majhfal, previously known as the 301st Infantry Battalion or Halbous Brigade, is a Libyan military unit operating under the authority of the National Unity Government. It was officially established in 2022 under Abdul Hamid Dbeibeh.

== History and Disposition ==
The 111th Brigade is led by Abdul Salam Zobi, a civilian who became active in the defense of Tripoli, Libya against the offensive by Khalifa Haftar’s forces. Zobi coordinated several armed groups before being formally appointed by the Ministry of Defense to command a unified military brigade. His leadership was key in preventing Major General Osama al-Juwaili’s forces from aiding the House of Representatives' attempt to reinstate Fathi Bashagha as president of the government and reclaim areas in Tripoli.

In August 2024, the brigade was stationed in the southwest of Tripoli as part of the city’s defense perimeter.

== Activities ==
The 111th Brigade aligns more closely with the Libyan military than many other armed factions in Tripoli. It often engages in law enforcement tasks, including operations against smugglers. The brigade has also been deployed as a neutral force to separate rival militias during clashes.

On 29 October 2023, the 111th Brigade was sent to Gharyan, south of Tripoli, following armed confrontations between the Stability Support Apparatus (SSA) and the Joint Security Force factions.

On May 13, 2025, during the 2025 Tripoli clashes, it was reported that the Brigade controlled the headquarters of the Stability Support Apparatus (SSA) in the al-Hadbah Project, Tripoli.

== Structure ==
- 80th Special Operations Battalion
