= Tripoli Protection Force =

- قوة حماية طرابلس
- Dates active: 18 December 2018 – present
- Country: Libya
- Allegiance: Libyan Army
- Wars: the Second Libyan Civil War

The Tripoli Protection Force is a militia that was formed from the merger of four pro-Libyan Army Libyan militias on 18 December 2018.

Groups involved in the merger include: the Tripoli Brigade, the Abusleem Deterence and Rapid Intervention Force, the Nawasi 8th Force, and the Bab Tajura brigade. All but the Bab Tajura brigade were considered the most prominent militias in Tripoli prior to the merger.
