= Kesikkavak, Haymana =

Kesikkavak
- Neighbourhood
- Location in Turkey Kesikkavak (Turkey Central Anatolia)
- Coordinates: 39.4356°N 32.4644°E
- Country: Turkey
- Province: Ankara
- District: Haymana
- Population (2022): 51
- Time zone: UTC+3 (TRT)

Kesikkavak is a neighbourhood in the municipality and district of Haymana, Ankara Province, Turkey. Its population is 51 (2022). Harmony Jets Flight 185 crashed near the neighbourhood on 23 December 2025.
