= Libyan Armed Forces =

Combined military forces of Libya

Libyan Armed Forces (GNU) Libyan Arab Armed Forces (HoR)
- القوات المسلحة الليبية (حكومة الوحدة الوطنية) القوات المسلحة العربية الليبية (مجلس النواب الليبي)
- Founded: 1951; 75 years ago
- Current form: 2011; 15 years ago (Libyan National Army) 2014; 12 years ago (Libyan Arab Armed Forces) 2016; 10 years ago Libyan Armed Forces (Government of National Accord: 2016–2021; GNU: 2021–present)
- Service branches: Libyan Ground Forces (GNU) or Libyan National Army (HoR); Libyan Air Force; Libyan Navy
- Headquarters: Tripoli (Libyan Armed Forces); Ar Rajma (Libyan Arab Armed Forces)

Leadership
- Commander-in-Chief: Mohamed al-Menfi (GNU); Khalifa Haftar (de facto) (LNA)
- Minister of Defence: Abdul Hamid Dbeibeh
- Chief of the General Staff: vacant

Personnel
- Active personnel: c. 32,000 Libyan Armed Forces c. 90,000 Libyan Arab Armed Forces

Industry
- Foreign suppliers: Current: Belgium; Belarus; China; Cuba; Czech Republic; Germany; Hungary; Iran; North Korea; Poland; Turkey; Romania; Russia; Ukraine; United Arab Emirates; United States; Vietnam; Historical: Czechoslovakia; Romania; East Germany; France; Italy; Soviet Union; United Kingdom

Related articles
- Ranks: Military ranks of Libya

The original Libyan Armed Forces (Arabic: القوات المسلحة الليبية) under the Kingdom of Libya of King Idris I was trained by the United Kingdom and the United States. Since Muammar Gaddafi rose to power in 1969, Libya received military assistance from the Soviet Union. The Libyan military fought in several wars, including the Libyan–Egyptian War (1977) and the Chadian–Libyan conflict (1978–1987).

The armed forces dissolved in the course of the Libyan civil war (2011), and after a second civil war, armed groups in Libya were divided between west and east. The Government of National Accord's Libyan Army is a collection of militias around Tripoli. In the east after Khalifa Haftar was appointed in 2015 by the Libyan parliament in Tobruk as the supreme commander, many militias in the eastern part of Libya came under his command as the "Libyan National Army" (LNA). (Arabic: الجيش الوطني الليبي). As of November 2019, the regular core of the LNA (about 7000 soldiers) was complemented by Salafist militias and foreign mercenaries (about 18000 soldiers).

As of 2019, the internationally recognised Government of National Accord (GNA) retained formal control of the militias nominally constituting the Libyan Army, while the Libyan Air Force was split into LNA and GNA controlled components. The naval and coast guard forces were mostly under GNA control. with some coastal patrol boats under LNA control. In 2021, armed groups in Libya were split between the Government of National Unity under the new President of Libya, Mohamed al-Menfi, and Haftar's forces in the East.

== History ==
=== Kingdom of Libya (1951–1969) ===
The roots of the Libyan armed forces can be traced to the Libyan Arab Force (popularly known as the Sanusi Army) of World War II. Shortly after Italy entered the war, a number of Libyan leaders living in exile in Egypt called on their compatriots to organise themselves into military units and join the British in the war against the Axis powers. Five battalions, which were initially designed for guerrilla warfare in the Jabal al Akhdar region of Cyrenaica, were established under British command. Because the high mobility of the desert campaigns required a considerable degree of technical and mechanical expertise, the Libyan forces were used primarily as auxiliaries, guarding military installations and prisoners. One battalion, however, participated in the fighting at Tobruk.

After Britain succeeded in occupying the Libyan territories, the need for the British-trained and equipped Sanusi troops appeared to be over. The Sanusi Army was reluctant to disband, however, and the majority of its members arranged to be transferred to the local police force in Cyrenaica under the British military administration.

The United Kingdom of Libya officially gained its independence from Italy on 24 December 1951. The Libyan government signed a 20-year military agreement with the British government on 26 July 1953. The kingdom was later renamed as the Kingdom of Libya in 1963.

Under the Libyan monarchy, there existed a federal army and local provincial police forces. The U.S. State Department reported in 1957 that the army numbered 1,835 men, while the police forces had around 5,000–6,000. King Idris of Libya and his government relied on the police for internal security and were anxious to increase the size of the national army to 5,000 troops.

When Libya gained its independence in 1951, veterans of the original Sanusi Army formed the nucleus of the Royal Libyan Army. British Army troops, part of Middle East Command and comprising 25th Armoured Brigade and briefly 10th Armoured Division, were still present after independence. Most British forces were withdrawn by 1966. Despite the Sanussi lineage of the new army, King Idris I quickly came to distrust them. The Free Officers' coup of 1952 in Egypt led many Libyan officers to be disenchanted with Idris and become great followers of Gamal Abdel Nasser. This situation reached the stage that the British Army officers retained by Idris to train and advise the new armed forces deemed the force entirely untrustworthy. They increasingly saw their role as to watch the army rather than to raise its effectiveness.

The United States also contributed to training a 1,035-man contingent and in June 1957 considered taking responsibility for training the entire army.

Meanwhile, Idris formed a navy in 1962 and an air force in 1963. In May 1957 the U.S. had agreed to supply Libya with 10 Northrop F-5s. He attempted to counter his growing doubts about the loyalty of the army by stripping it of potential. He placed loyal but often unqualified Cyrenaicans in all senior command positions, limited the armed forces to 6,500 men, kept the army lightly armed, and built up two rival paramilitary units, the National Security Force and the Cyrenaican Defence Force which was recruited from Cyrenaican Bedouin loyal to the Sanussi. Together the two forces had a total of 14,000 men armed with helicopters, armoured cars, anti-tank weapons, and artillery.

These measures did not prevent, however, a group of army officers led by then Captain Muammar Gaddafi (a signals officer) seizing power on 1 September 1969. Pollack says that the defeat of the Arabs during the Six-Day War of July 1967 was an important factor in the coup, as the officers believed that Libya should have dispatched forces to aid Egypt and the other Arab states. Idris had also tried to reform the military, but only half-heartedly, further frustrating young Libyan officers. Gaddafi's coup was only one of several being planned by various groups within the armed forces.

=== Gaddafi's period of rule (1969–2011) ===
Immediately after the coup, Muammar Gaddafi began to dismiss, arrest, or execute every officer above the rank of colonel in the armed forces, as well as some other lower-ranking officers closely linked to the monarchy. Then he began to reorganise the armed forces in line with his foreign policy plans. Expansion of the army and amalgamation of the CDF and NSF into the army was the first priority, and by 1970 the force numbered nearly 20,000. Attention was also focused on the Air Force, with the pre-coup strength of 400 personnel and ten Northrop F-5 "Freedom Fighter" jet fighters planned to be supplemented with large-scale purchases of Mirage III fighters from France.

Libya dispatched a contingent to the Arab Deterrent Force in Lebanon in 1976 as the Lebanese Civil War escalated. In the spring of 1979, after the Arab League had extended the mandate of the Arab Deterrent Force, the Sudanese, the Saudis and the UAE troops departed Lebanon, the Libyan troops were essentially abandoned and had to find their own way home, if at all.

The new Libyan Army under Gaddafi's Libyan Arab Republic fought a short border war with Egypt in July 1977, and sent several thousand troops to support Idi Amin during the Uganda–Tanzania War in 1972 and again in 1978.

From the late 1970s to around 1987, Gaddafi escalated the Chadian–Libyan conflict with four major incursions into Chad. Libya temporarily seized the Aouzou Strip. The Libyan Army suffered great losses in these conflicts, especially that of the Toyota War of 1987, largely due to poor tactics and Western aid to Chad. All of these incursions were eventually repulsed.

In 1997 the IISS listed seven military regions as part of the Armed Forces. These regions appear to have included the Western Military Region (Tripoli), the Middle Military Region (Sirte), the Eastern Military Region (Tobruk), the Mountain Military Region (Gharyan), and regions headquartered at Kufra and Benghazi. The final military region appears to have been the Southern Military Region headquartered at Sabha in the southeast.

In October 1993, senior military officers from the Warfalla tribe attempted to depose Gaddafi from power. The coup was led by Khalifa Haftar, a leading senior officer, who later defected during the coup. The result was the execution of many senior officers and the installment of loyal members.

A military parade of African and Libyan troops took place on Green Square on 1 September 2009. This marked the first day of celebrations of the 40th anniversary of the Libyan Revolution.

In November 2010, before the revolt against Gaddahi began, the total number of Libyan armed forces personnel was estimated at 76,000. It was estimated that there were an additional 40,000 People's Militia. There was no separate defence ministry; all defence activities were centralised under Muammar Gaddafi. There was a High Command of the Armed Forces (al-Qiyada al-ulya lil-quwwat al-musallaha). Arms production was limited and manufacturers were state-owned. Colonel Abu-Bakr Yunis Jabr was the last minister of defence of the Gaddafi-era military.

The Libyan army was estimated to have 50,000 total troops as of 2009; 25,000 volunteers with an additional 25,000 conscripts. The IISS estimated that year that the army included 11 border defence and 4 security zones, one regime security brigade, 10 tank battalions, 10 mechanized infantry battalions, 18 infantry battalions, 6 commando battalions, 22 artillery battalions, 4 SSM brigades and 7 air defence artillery battalions. Khamis Gaddafi's 32nd Brigade ('Khamis Brigade') was one of the main regime protection forces, and was considered by US diplomats in 2009 as the most capable of defending the regime. In addition, the Revolutionary Guard Corps also served as a brigade-sized protection force for Gaddafi. In 2009, it emerged that a British Special Air Service team were training Libyan special forces. Under Gaddafi, conscription was listed as 18 months.

Paramilitary forces included the Revolutionary Guard Corps, Gaddafi's bodyguard force; the Pan-African Legion; the Islamic Legion; and the People's Militia.

The Libyan Army ceased functioning following the rebel victory in the First Libyan Civil War.

==== Army equipment ====
From the 1970s Libyan bought a large number of Soviet armoured fighting vehicles (AFVs). An initial delivery of tanks and artillery was made in July 1970. Since the coup in September 1969, the Soviets began making offers to Libya. In return, Deputy Prime Minister Jallud and another member of the RCC journeyed to Moscow in November to line up military supplies in case talks with the British collapsed. In March, Jallud was reported to have gone to Moscow again, rather than to his announced destination of Cairo. The Libyans reportedly said they preferred Soviet T-55 tanks (an improved model of the T–54) if Chieftains could not be obtained from the British. The State Department wrote that at least 57 T–54/55 tanks, plus Soviet-made artillery and armored vehicles were unloaded from two Soviet vessels.

Many more deliveries followed, and large quantities of equipment were in store for long periods. In 1977, in U.S.-Israeli discussions about a potential next Arab-Israeli war, the Israeli Intelligence director, Major-General Gazit, told U.S. officials that "..Libyan forces are not important as expeditionary forces; the most important aspect is its military stockpiling. This armament could be delivered to other Arab states before, during or after a conflict for re-supply purposes. Libya, for example, could supply eight or nine hundred tanks to any Arab state. It is the same equipment although its degree of maintenance may be a factor."

Eventually many AFVs became obsolete. A high percentage remained in storage and a large amount of equipment was also sold to various African countries.

The International Institute for Strategic Studies estimated tank numbers in 2009 as 2,025, including 1000+ T-54/T-55; 600 T-62, of which 462 were in store; and 150 T-72, of which 115 in store.

Russian official sources reported in 2010 that T-72s would be modernised with help from Russia. 750 BTR-50 and BTR-60s were also reported by the IISS.

The IISS estimated there were 500 BRDM-2 and 700 EE-9 Cascavel reconnaissance vehicles, 1,000 BMP-1s, plus BMDs. Other reported wheeled vehicles in service include 1000 EE-11 Urutu and Czechoslovak OT-64 SKOT.

The IISS estimated artillery in service in 2009 as totaling 2,421 pieces.

444 SP artillery pieces were reported:

- 122 mm – 130 2S1 Carnation;
- 152 mm – 140: 60 2S3 Akatsiya; 80 M-77 Dana;
- 155 mm – 174: 14 M-109; 160 VCA 155 Palmaria.

647+ towed artillery pieces were reported:

- 105 mm – 42+ M-101
- 122 mm – 250: 190 D-30; 60 D-74;
- 130 mm – 330 M-46;
- 152 mm – 25 ML-20.
- 155 mm – ? M114 155 mm howitzer

830 multiple rocket launchers were reported:

- 107 mm Type 63 multiple rocket launcher – an estimated 300;
- 122 mm – 530: ε200 BM-11; ε230 BM-21 Grad; ε100 RM-70 Dana (RM-70 multiple rocket launcher?).

The IISS also estimated that Libya had 500 mortars:

- 82 mm – 428;
- 120 mm – ε48 120-PM-43 mortar;
- 160 mm – ε24 160mm Mortar M1943.

Surface-to-surface missiles reported in service included FROG-7 and SCUD-B (416 missiles).

Anti-tank missiles reported in service included 400 French/German MILAN, and 620+ AT-3, AT-4, and AT-5, all of Soviet manufacture.

In 2009, the IISS estimated that Libya had Crotale, SA-7 Grail, and SA-9/SA-13 surface-to-air missiles, as well as AA guns in Army service. A separate Air Defence Command had SA-2 Guideline, SA-3 Goa, SA-5 Gammon, and SA-8b Gecko missiles, plus guns.

Reported anti-aircraft artillery included Soviet 57 mm S-60, 23 mm self-propelled ZSU-23-4 and ZU-23-2, Czech M53/59 Praga, and Swedish Bofors 40 mm guns.

Small arms reported in service included TT pistol, Browning Hi-Power, Beretta M12, FN P90, FN FAL, SKS, AK-47, AKM and AK-103 assault rifles, the FN F2000, Soviet RPD machine gun, RPK machine gun, PK machine guns, DShK heavy machine gun, KPV heavy machine guns, SG-43 Goryunov, and a number of RPG-type and anti-aircraft missile systems: RPG-2, RPG-7, 9K32 Strela-2.

Even in the five years between 2005 and 2009, large quantities of arms and ammunition were delivered to Libya. It is not always clear which armed service or police organisation received the weaponry.

- Bulgaria delivered €1,850,594 worth of material in the category of small arms in 2006. In 2009, the country licensed the delivery of €3.73 million of material in the category of ammunition. It is not clear whether all 3.73 million of material was actually delivered.
- Serbia exported $1,920,185 of equipment including assault rifles for 'civilian and military end-users' to Libya in 2009. In 2008 Serbia exported $1,613,280 of equipment including automatic rifles and sub-machine guns. There also were large deliveries to brokers acting as intermediaries for several countries including Libya in 2005, 2006 and 2007.

==== Air & Air Defence Forces ====
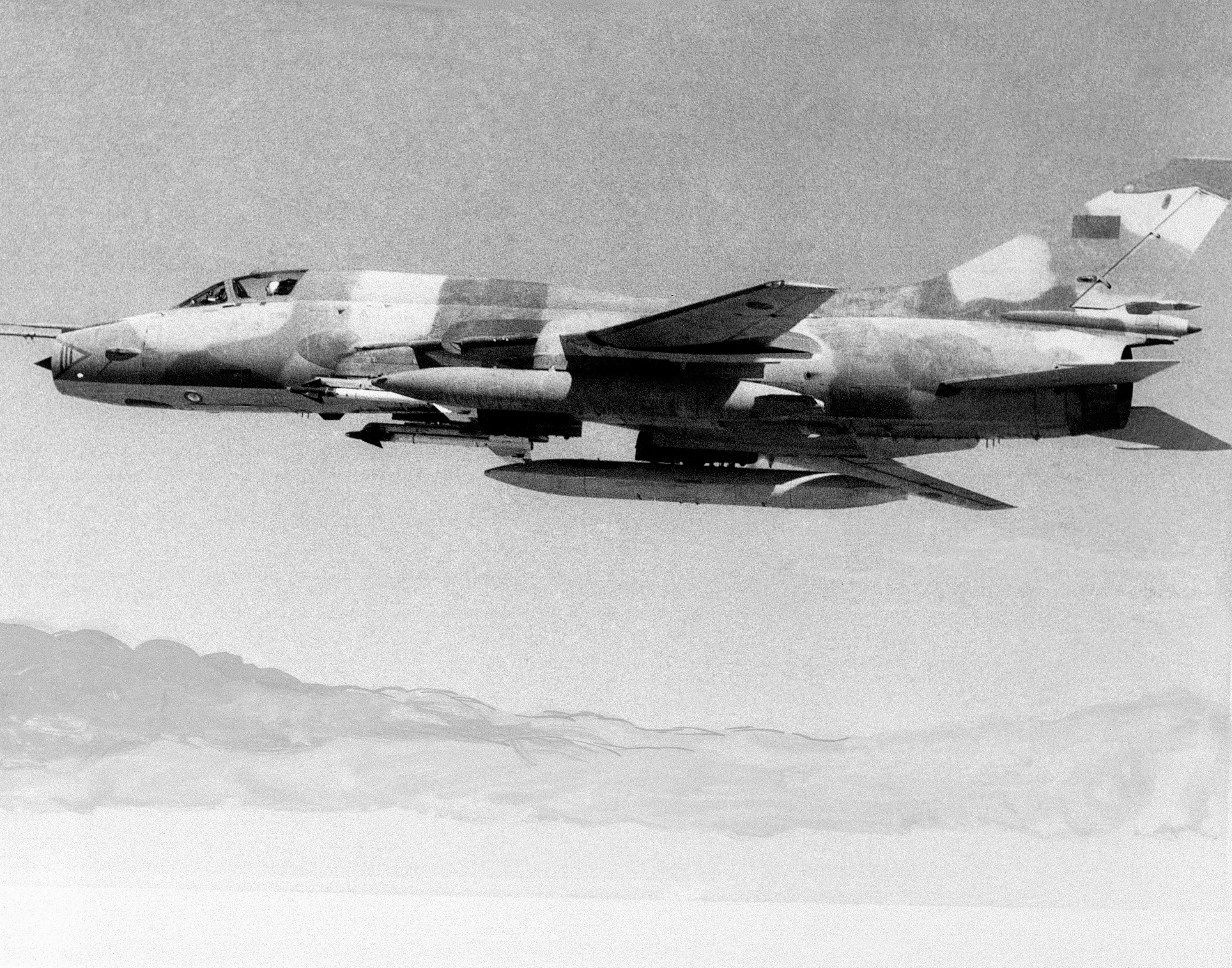
Libyan Su-22 fighter-bomber, 1985.

In 1963 the Libyan Air Force was created. The United States and the UK had pressured then-ruling King Idris to modernise his armed forces so that they could better stand off against revolutionary regimes in the Middle East. Scores of French Mirage III aircraft were bought. The Libyan Air Force had an estimated personnel strength of 22,000 in 2005. There were 13 military airbases in Libya.

During the rebellion against Gaddafi, the Free Libyan Air Force was established. All combat aircraft of the Libyan Air Force that were not in rebel hands were destroyed by NATO bombings during the civil war.

==== Navy ====
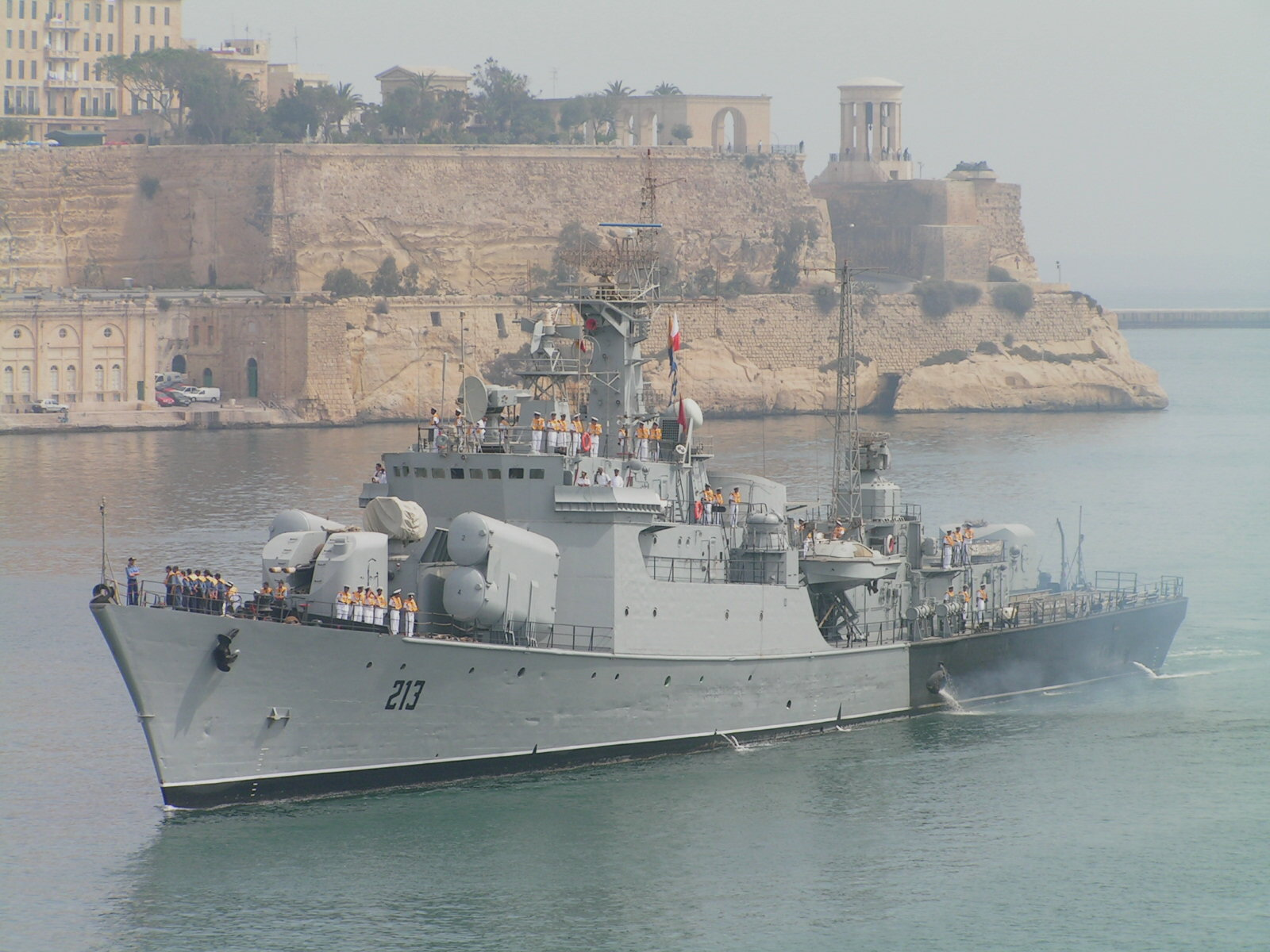
Libyan frigate Al Ghardabia in Valletta, 2005.

The Libyan Navy was established in November 1962. It had a few missile frigates, corvettes and patrol boats to defend the coastline, but with a very limited self-defence capability. The Navy was always the smallest of Libya's services and has always been dependent on foreign sources for equipment, spare parts, and training. The total personnel of the Libyan Navy was about 8,000.

Its first warship was delivered in 1966. After the rise of Colonel Muammar Gaddafi in 1969, Libya started to buy weapons and larger vessels from Europe and the Soviet Union. The Customs and Harbour police were amalgamated with the Navy in 1970, extending the Navy's mission to include anti-smuggling and customs duties. Libya received six Foxtrot-class submarines from the Soviet Union in 1982.

Much of the Libyan Navy was rendered inoperable by NATO bombing in 2011.

==== People's Militia ====
In 1987 the mission of the 45,000 People's Militia was territorial defence. It was to function under the leadership of local military commanders. Gaddafi contended that it was the People's Militia that met the Egyptian incursions during the border clash of 1977, although the Egyptians insisted that their successful raids had been contested by regular army units. The militia forces were not known to have faced any other test that would permit an appraisal of their performance in home defence or as auxiliaries to the regular army. There was some evidence that local commanders had not responded energetically to their responsibility for training and supervising militia units. Militia units were reportedly generously equipped with arms, transport, and uniforms.

In November 1985, it was announced that the first contingent of "armed people" trained as paratroopers had made a demonstration drop. Thousands of People's Militiamen were part of the Libyan expeditionary force that was airlifted to Uganda in 1979. The Libyan troops were supposed to help defend the collapsing regime of Ugandan dictator Idi Amin, an ally of Gaddafi, amid the Uganda–Tanzania War. Like the other Libyan units sent to Uganda, the People's Militia was ill-prepared (some militiamen were not even informed that they were supposed to fight, and had believed theirs to be a pure training mission) and consequently suffered heavy losses during the Battle of Lukaya and Battle of Entebbe. Amin's government was overthrown, and the surviving Libyans were forced to flee Uganda.

It is not clear whether the force still existed by the time of the 2011 civil war.

==== Uniforms, ranks, and insignia as of 1987 ====
When the army and navy were formed, the uniforms adopted by each service reflected British military and naval tradition. Modifications have occurred over the intervening years, however, and in early 1987 Libyan uniforms were similar to those worn by military personnel of a number of Middle-Eastern Arab countries. The standard field uniform for Libyan paratroopers (Army commandos) was a two-piece camouflage uniform made of water repellent cotton. The shirt was similar in design to the United States Army fatigue shirt. The shirt and trousers were camouflaged in blue-green, light green, and dark brown. The standard headgear for paratroopers was a sky-blue beret. The uniforms of the air force, however, continued to resemble in both style and colour the uniforms of the United States Air Force, which served as a model when the Libyan Air Force was established.

Originally the rank structure of all three services was similar to that of the British Armed Forces, but some modifications were introduced in light of the small size of the Libyan military establishment. In early 1979, the system prescribed by law still included nine officer grades and five enlisted ranks; there were no warrant officer equivalents. Although three general officer grades continued to be authorised, they have not been used since the 1969 coup. Promoted to the grade of colonel (aqid) after assuming power, Gaddafi maintained a ceiling on the grade level of his officer corps in keeping with his desire to avoid the ostentatious public image that the generals of the monarchy had conveyed. In January 1976, the Arab Socialist Union's National Congress attempted to promote Gaddafi to major general. The Libyan leader stated that he would accept the honour as an expression of gratitude from his compatriots but would retain the title of colonel because it had become an accepted and traditional part of his name.

=== 2011–2014 ===
During the 2011–2014 transition period, the Libyan armed forces consisted mostly of a shifting ensemble of militias being created and dissolved and creating and dropping alliances.

Militia "units" included the 17th Thunderbolt Special Forces Brigade based in Tripoli (2013), and the 27th Brigade, based in Tripoli (2013),led by Mohammed Buzeiud, which was briefly trained at Bassingbourn Barracks, United Kingdom during 2014. Numerous criminal allegations were made against the Libyan trainees, including sexual assault.

=== Second civil war (2014–2020) ===
As of 2019, armed groups in Libya, composed to a large degree of militias, remain split between the internationally recognised Government of National Accord (GNA) in Tripoli, and those led by Khalifa Haftar, the Libyan National Army (LNA) on behalf of the part of the national parliament in Tobruk. The forces included ground forces divided between the GNA-led Libyan Army (including militia coalitions such as the Tripoli Protection Force) and the LNA; both GNA and LNA air forces; while the naval, and coast guard forces were mostly under GNA control with some coastal patrol boats under LNA control.

Prime Minister Fayez al-Sarraj, the head of the GNA, was nominally the supreme commander of the GNA forces. The military is under the authority of the GNA Ministry of Defense, formerly led by Colonel Al-Mahdi Al-Barghathi from 2016 to 2018, at which point Sarraj took over as defense minister.

During 2015–2018, the LNA under Haftar's control unified many militias in the eastern part of Libya. They remained as of November 2019, dominated by Salafist militias and foreign members. They used online social networks to present the image of growing military and political power. As of 2019, the LNA consisted of about 7000 regular soldiers and 18000 militia and foreign members.

== See also ==
- Green Resistance
- Brigade 93
