= List of wars: 2020–present =

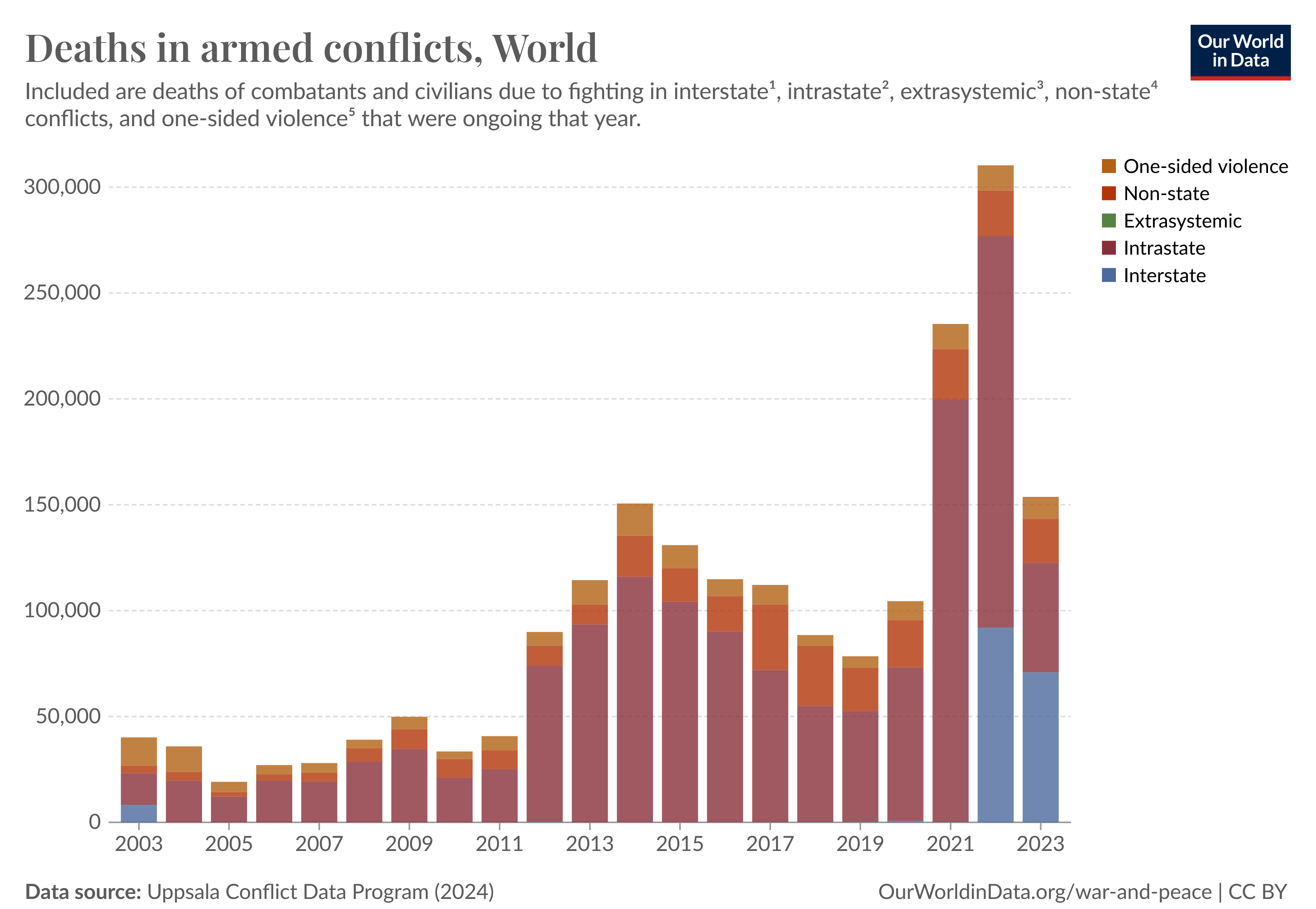
Graph of deaths in armed conflicts by type from 2003 to 2023

This is a list of wars that began from 2020 onwards. Other wars can be found in the historical lists of wars and the list of wars extended by diplomatic irregularity.

== List ==
Started	Ended	Name of conflict	Belligerents	
Started	Ended	Name of conflict	Victorious party (if applicable)	Defeated party (if applicable)
2020	Ongoing	Gang war in Haiti; Part of crime in Haiti and the Haitian crisis	Haitian security forces; Haitian National Police; Haitian Armed Forces; Gang Suppression Force; Kenya; Chad; Jamaica; Belize; Bahamas; Vatican City; Guatemala; El Salvador; Support: United States; Canada; France; Spain; Germany; Mexico; Algeria	Viv Ansanm; G11; Delmas 6; Baz Pilate; Baz Krache Dife; Waf Jérémie; Nan Boston; G-Pèp; 400 Mawozo; Nan Brooklyn; Chen Mechan; Kraze Baryè; 5 Segond; Gran Ravine; Taliban (Canaan); Mariani; Ti Bwa; Nan Ti Bwa; Simon Pelé; Belekou; Other affiliated groups; Protesters, self-defense groups, and other armed factions; Bwa kale vigilantes; Brigade for the Security of Protected Areas
2020	2021	2020–2021 China–India skirmishes Part of the Sino-Indian border dispute	China	India
2020	Ongoing	Belarusian partisan movement	Belarus	Belarusian opposition; Coordination Council; BYPOL; BELPOL
2020	2024	Western Togoland Rebellion	Ghana; Ghana Armed Forces; Minister for Defence	Western Togoland; Western Togoland Restoration Front
2020	2020	Second Nagorno-Karabakh War; Part of the Nagorno-Karabakh conflict	Azerbaijan; Turkey (alleged by Armenia) (Syrian opposition) Syrian mercenaries (Note: Denied by Azerbaijan and Turkey.)	Artsakh; Armenia
2020	2024	Afar–Somali clashes	Somali Region	Afar Region
2020	2022	Tigray war Part of the Ethiopian civil conflict	Tigray; OLA (2021–22)	Ethiopia; Eritrea
2020	Ongoing	Western Saharan clashes Part of the Western Sahara conflict	Kingdom of Morocco	Sahrawi Arab Democratic Republic
2020	2022	Al-Fashaga conflict Part of the Spillover of the Tigray war	Sudan	(Amhara Region) Amhara militias Alleged: Ethiopia; Eritrea
2021	Ongoing	Insurgency in Southeastern Nigeria; Part of the herder–farmer conflicts in Nigeria and the conflict in the Niger Delta	(Republic of Biafra) Biafran separatists Oduduwa separatists (only against Fulani herders)	Nigeria Spillover into Bakassi: Cameroon
2021	2021	2021 Kyrgyzstan–Tajikistan clashes Part of the post-Soviet conflicts	Kyrgyzstan	Tajikistan
2021	Ongoing	Myanmar civil war Part of the Myanmar conflict	State Administration Council; Tatmadaw; Myanmar Army; Border Guard Forces (Note: former New Democratic Army – Kachin, Lahu Democratic Front, Karen National Army); Myanmar Air Force; Myanmar Navy; Myanmar Coast Guard; Myanmar Police Force; Border Guard Police; Pyusawhti militias; Thway Thout; Aligned ethnic armed organisations: Arakan Liberation Army; Pa-O National Army; Karen National Army; Shanni Nationalities Army; Zomi Revolutionary Army (Note: Despite having issued a public statement of support for anti-junta resistance in April 2021, the ZRA has been supplied by and worked alongside the junta to attack resistance.); Wuyang People's Militia; Arakan Rohingya Salvation Army; Rohingya Solidarity Organisation; Smaller pro-SAC ethnic armed organisations	National Unity Government; People's Defence Force; Allied ethnic armed organisations: Northern Alliance; Kachin Independence Army; Brotherhood Alliance; Arakan Army; Myanmar National Democratic Alliance Army; Ta'ang National Liberation Army; 4K Coalition; Karen National Liberation Army; Karenni Army; Karenni National People's Liberation Front (since 2023); Karenni Nationalities Defence Force; Chinland Council; Chin National Army; Chinland Defence Force; Chin Brotherhood Alliance; Chin National Defence Force; Zoland Defence Force; Karen National Defence Organisation; Bamar People's Liberation Army; Pa-O National Liberation Army (since 2024); Smaller ethnic armed organisations; Other organisations: All Burma Students' Democratic Front; People's Liberation Army (Myanmar); Anti-Fascist Internationalist Front; Small independent anti-SAC guerrilla groups (Note: Hundreds of anti-SAC local defence forces are strewn across the country, which operate unconventionally, carrying out hit-and-run attacks, targeted killings, ambushes, remote bombings and a small number of rocket attacks.)
2021	2021	2021 Israel–Palestine crisis Part of the Israeli–Palestinian conflict	Israel; Israel Defense Forces; Israeli Air Force; Israel Police; Israel Border Police; Shin Bet; Jewish Israeli protesters	Gaza Strip; Hamas; Palestinian Islamic Jihad; Popular Front for the Liberation of Palestine; Al-Aqsa Martyrs' Brigades; Smaller militant groups (Note: Besides Hamas and the Palestinian Islamic Jihad, FDD's Long War Journal identified the following militant groups as having fought in the 2021 conflict: Jihad Jibril Brigades, Humat al-Aqsa, Jaysh al-Ummah, Katibat al-Sheikh al-Emireen, Mujahideen Brigades, Abdul al-Qadir al-Husseini Brigades, and two al-Aqsa Martyrs Brigades splinter factions.); Protesters in Israel and Palestine: Arab Israeli protesters; Palestinian protesters in the West Bank and Jerusalem; Jordanian, Lebanese, and Syrian protesters (see international)
2021	Ongoing	Armenia–Azerbaijan border crisis Part of the Nagorno-Karabakh conflict	Armenia	Azerbaijan
2021	Ongoing	Republican insurgency in Afghanistan; Part of the Afghan conflict	Islamic Emirate of Afghanistan; Taliban; al-Qaeda (alleged); Supported by: Pakistan (until 2024; unconfirmed)	Islamic Republic of Afghanistan loyalists (Note: Though the Islamic Republic of Afghanistan ceased to exist on 15 August 2021, many soldiers, officials and other loyalists relocated to Panjshir and rallied under its banner. These elements and exiled officials claimed to maintain the republic in some form, with Amrullah Saleh styling himself "caretaker" president.); National Resistance Front (NRF); Ahmad Khan Samangani Front; Afghanistan Freedom Front; Afghanistan Islamic National & Liberation Movement; Many smaller factions (Note: Freedom Corps, Liberation Front of Afghanistan, Soldiers of Hazaristan, Freedom and Democracy Front, High Council of Resistance, Atta Mohammad Noor's militia, ect.); Supported by: Tajikistan (alleged) Pakistan (alleged, since 2024); Independent militias
2021	2021	2021 Afghanistan–Iran clashes Part of the spillover of the Afghanistan conflict	Afghanistan	Iran
2022	Ongoing	Chittagong Hill Tracts conflict Part of terrorism in Bangladesh	Bangladesh; PCJSS-MN Larma; UPDF-D	PCJSS; UPDF; Kuki-Chin National Front
2022	Ongoing	Russian invasion of Ukraine; Part of the Russo-Ukrainian War (outline)	Russia; Donetsk PR; Luhansk PR; Belarus (Note: In 2022, Belarus allowed Russia to use its territory to launch the invasion and to launch missiles into Ukraine.); North Korea	Ukraine
2022	Ongoing	M23 campaign Part of the Kivu conflict and the DRC–Rwanda conflict	Congo River Alliance (from Dec 2023); M23 Movement; Twirwaneho (from Feb 2025); RED-Tabara (from Feb 2025); Mai-Mai Rushaba (from March 2025); Rwanda (Note: Rwandan involvement was first alleged by the DR Congo, a claim which was later substantiated by the findings of researchers tasked by the United Nations. Rwanda has denied its support for M23.)	DR Congo (United Nations) MONUSCO: Pakistan; India; Russia; Serbia; Tanzania; Morocco; Malawi (until 2025); South Africa; (East African Community) EAC Regional Force: Uganda (March – June 2022); Burundi (August 2022–present); Kenya (from November 2022); South Sudan (from December 2022); SADC Mission in DRC (until 2025); FDLR (Democratic Republic of the Congo) Wazalendo: Nduma Defense of Congo-Renovated; Pro-government Mai-Mai; Pro-government Nyatura factions; APCLS
2022	Ongoing	Russian partisan movement	Russia	Russian opposition; BOAK; Stop the Wagons; Black Bridge; National Republican Army; Freedom of Russia Legion; Russian Volunteer Corps; NS/WP; Artpodgotovka; Silent Crow; Atesh; Cyber Partisans; People's Resistance of Ukraine; Rebellious army conscripts; other rebel groups; Separatist movements; North Caucasus partisans; (Circassia) Circassian nationalists; Ingush Independence Committee; Ingush Liberation Army; Chechen militants; OBON; Adat People's Movement; Committee of Bashkir Resistance (Note: in the Bashkortostan region only); Sibir Battalion; Karelian National Movement; Nord; other separatist movements
2022	Ongoing	Western DR Congo clashes	Mobondo militia	Democratic Republic of the Congo
2022	2022	al-Shabaab invasion of Ethiopia; Part of the Ethiopian–Somali conflict, the Somali Civil War, Ethiopian civil conflict and the spillover of the Tigray war	Ethiopia; Somali Region	Al-Qaeda; Al-Shabaab
2022	Ongoing	North Kosovo crisis	Kosovo; Albania; Diplomatic support: NATO; European Union	Serbia; Diplomatic support: China; Russia; Hungary; Greece; Cyprus; Montenegro; Republika Srpska
2022	2022	2022 Gaza–Israel clashes Part of the Israeli–Palestinian conflict	Israel; Israel Defense Forces; Israeli Air Force	(Palestine) Gaza Strip; Palestinian Islamic Jihad
2022	2022	September 2022 Armenia–Azerbaijan clashes Part of the Armenia–Azerbaijan border crisis	Armenia	Azerbaijan
2022	2022	2022 Kyrgyzstan–Tajikistan clashes Part of the post-Soviet conflicts	Kyrgyzstan	Tajikistan; Afghan mujahids (per Kyrgyzstan)
2023	Ongoing	Las Anod conflict Part of the Somali Civil War	Somaliland	SSC-Khatumo; Supported by: Somalia; Harti militiamen
2023	Ongoing	War in Amhara; Part of the Ethiopian civil conflict	Fano factions; Amhara People's Army; Wollo Fano; Gojjam Fano; Gondar Fano; Shewa Fano	Ethiopia; ENDF; Amhara Region Government
2023	2023	2023 Afghanistan–Iran clash	Afghanistan	Iran
2023	Ongoing	Sudanese civil war Part of the Sudanese Civil Wars	Transitional Sovereignty Council; Sudanese Armed Forces; PDF; Popular Resistance; Al-Bara Battalion; AWB; SPLM-N (Agar); JEM; SLM (Minnawi); SLM (Tambour) (from August 2023); Joint Darfur Force (from November 2023); Foreign Support; Ukraine; Turkey	(Sudan) Government of Peace and Unity (from April 2025); Rapid Support Forces; Non-RSF Janjaweed militias; SPLM-N (al-Hilu) (from February 2025); Tamazuj (from August 2023); Foreign Support Libyan National Army United Arab Emirates Wagner Group; SLM (al-Nur) SPLM-N (al-Hilu) (June 2023 – February 2025)
2023	2023	Wagner Group rebellion Part of the Wagner–MoD conflict during the Russian invasion of Ukraine	PMC Wagner	Russia; Ministry of Defense; Armed Forces; FSB; National Guard; Kadyrovites
2023	2023	2023 Azerbaijani offensive in Nagorno-Karabakh; Part of the Nagorno-Karabakh conflict	Azerbaijan (Note: See § Foreign involvement for more details.)	(Republic of Artsakh) Artsakh (Note: See § Foreign involvement for more details.)
2023	Ongoing	Gaza war Part of the Gaza–Israel conflict, the Israeli–Palestinian conflict, and the Middle Eastern crisis	Israel (Note: See List of military aid to Israel during the Gaza war and American involvement) Israeli allies: Popular Forces (Note: Popular Forces have been described as a Salafi Jihadist organisation with alleged ties to the Islamic State) (Note: From May 2024)	Hamas Palestinian allies: Palestinian Islamic Jihad Popular Front for the Liberation of Palestine Democratic Front for the Liberation of Palestine Al-Aqsa Martyrs' Brigades Palestinian Mujahideen Movement Palestinian Freedom Movement Popular Resistance Committees Popular Front for the Liberation of Palestine – General Command; (Palestine) Abdul al-Qadir al-Husseini Brigades Jaysh al-Ummah
2023	Ongoing	Israel–Hezbollah conflict Part of the Hezbollah–Israel conflict, the Middle Eastern crisis and the Iran–Israel conflict during the Syrian civil war	Israel	Hezbollah Allies: Amal Islamic Group SSNP-L Hamas PIJ Popular Resistance Committees Popular Front for the Liberation of Palestine Islamic Resistance in Iraq (Yemen) Houthis Iran Syria (until 2024) Islamic Azz Brigades
2023	2024	Attacks on US bases during the Gaza war Part of the Iran–Israel proxy conflict, the Middle Eastern crisis, the Syrian opposition offensives, and the Eastern Syria insurgency in the Syrian civil war	United States; United Kingdom; Supported by: Jordan Syrian Democratic Forces (Syrian opposition) Al-Tanf Garrison	Iran; Ba'athist Syria (until 2024); Proxies; Islamic Resistance in Iraq; Syrian Hezbollah; Liwa Fatemiyoun; Popular Mobilization Forces
2024	Ongoing	Ecuadorian conflict Part of the Ecuadorian security crisis and the war on drugs	Government of Ecuador	Organized crime groups, notably Los Choneros
2024	2024	2024 Iran–Pakistan border skirmishes Part of the insurgency in Balochistan and Sistan and Baluchestan insurgency	Iran Claimed by Pakistan: Baloch Nationalists: Balochistan Liberation Army; Balochistan Liberation Front	Pakistan Claimed by Iran: Islamists: Jaish ul-Adl
2024	2025	Kursk offensive Part of attacks in Russia during the Russian invasion of Ukraine	Russia; North Korea (Note: From November 2024)	Ukraine
2024	Ongoing	Hamas–Popular Forces conflict Part of the Gaza war	(Palestine) Popular Forces; Israel; Supported by: Palestinian Authority (denied by the PA)	Hamas
2024	2024	2024 Israeli invasion of Lebanon; Part of the Israel–Hezbollah conflict, the Middle Eastern crisis and the Israeli–Lebanese conflict	Israel	Hezbollah Allies: Amal Movement Islamic Group SSNP-L (Yemen) Houthi movement Popular Front for the Liberation of Palestine Palestinian Islamic Jihad Islamic Resistance in Iraq; Lebanon (Note: The Lebanese government stated they will stay out of the conflict between Hezbollah and Israel, but would respond to Israeli attacks on their positions.) UNIFIL (Note: Although UNIFIL is a peacekeeping force and is not actively engaged in hostilities, its positions have been targeted and its peacekeepers have suffered casualties.)
2024	2024	2024 Syrian opposition offensives Part of the Syrian civil war	Syrian Opposition; Syrian Salvation Government; (Syrian opposition) Syrian Interim Government; (Syrian opposition) Jaysh al-Izza; Turkistan Islamic Party in Syria; Jama'at Ansar al-Islam; Ajnad al-Kavkaz; Imam Bukhari Jamaat; Ansar al-Tawhid; (Syria) Burkan al-Furat; (Syrian opposition) Southern Operations Room; (Syrian opposition) Syrian Free Army; (Syrian opposition) Suqour al-Sham Brigades	Syrian Government; Iran; Russia; Hezbollah; DAANES; CJTF–OIR; United States (Note: Armament support only.)
2024	2026	Israeli invasion of Syria	Israel	Syria (Palestine) Palestinian militants Assad loyalists
2024	Ongoing	Jubaland crisis	Jubaland; Supported by: Ethiopia	Somalia; Supported by: Turkey
2024	Ongoing	Assadist Insurgency in Syria	Syria (Note: Caretaker government until 29 March; Transitional government from 29 March) Saraya Ansar al-Sunnah	(Ba'athist Syria) Assadist Insurgents: Syrian Popular Resistance; (Ba'athist Syria) Military Council for the Liberation of Syria; (Ba'athist Syria) Coastal Shield Brigade; (Ba'athist Syria) Rijal al Nour; Hezbollah; Eastern Lebanese tribes; Supported by: Iran (alleged)
2025	2025	2025 Goma offensive and others Part of the M23 campaign	Congo River Alliance; March 23 Movement; Rwanda	DR Congo; SADC; United Nations
2025	2025	2025 Nasir clashes Part of the aftermath of the South Sudanese Civil War	Nuer White Army	South Sudan Uganda (9 March–1 April); (United Nations) UNMISS
2025	2025	2025 India–Pakistan conflict Part of the India–Pakistani wars and conflicts, 2025 India–Pakistan crisis, insurgency in Jammu and Kashmir, and the Kashmir conflict	India	Pakistan
2025	2025	2025 Tripoli clashes Part of the Libyan crisis	Government of National Unity; 444th Infantry Brigade	Stability Support Apparatus Libya Shield Force; Special Deterrence Forces
2025	2025	2025 Cambodian–Thai border crisis	Thailand	Cambodia
2025	2025	Twelve-Day War; Part of the Iran–Israel conflict	Israel; United States	Iran; Houthis; Islamic Resistance in Iraq
2025	Ongoing	Southern Syria clashes	Druze armed groups Israel	Syria
2025	Ongoing	Operation Southern Spear	United States	Venezuela; Cartel of the Suns (alleged); Tren de Aragua (alleged); National Liberation Army (alleged)
2025	2025	2025 Afghanistan–Pakistan conflict	Afghanistan	Pakistan
2025	2026	Jonglei clashes	(South Sudan) SPLA-IO; (South Sudan) SPLA-IO Kit-Gwang; (South Sudan) SSOA defectors; Nuer White Army	South Sudan; SSPDF; Agwelek forces
2026	Ongoing	2026 Afghanistan–Pakistan war Part of the Afghanistan-Pakistan clashes	Pakistan	Afghanistan; Pakistani Taliban
2026	Ongoing	2026 Iran war	Israel United States; Bahrain Kuwait Oman Qatar United Arab Emirates Jordan Saudi Arabia Iraq Akrotiri and Dhekelia	Iran; Popular Mobilization Forces; Houthis
2026	Ongoing	2026 Lebanon war	Israel; Lebanon; (United Nations) UNIFIL	Hezbollah
