= Borders of Ethiopia =

Ethiopia within Africa

Ethiopia shares borders with seven countries: Eritrea to the north, Djibouti to the north-east, Somalia to the south-east, Somaliland to the east, Sudan to the north-west, South Sudan to the south-east and Kenya to the south.

== List of borders ==
Country	Border-direction	Length (km)	Ref.
Eritrea	North	1,033 kilometers	
Djibouti	North-east	375 kilometers	
Somalia	South-east	1,648 kilometers	
Somaliland	East	745 kilometers	
Sudan	North-west	744 kilometers	
Kenya	South	861 kilometers	

== List of disputed border incidents ==
Disputed country	Article	Year	Disputed territory
Eritrea	Eritrean–Ethiopian border conflict	1998–2018	Badme
Sudan	Al-Fashaga conflict	2020–2022	Al-Fashaga
Somalia	Ethiopian–Somali conflict	1948–present	Ogaden region
