= Battle of Tripoli (2018) =

Battle during the Second Libyan Civil War

- Part of the Libyan civil war (2014–2020) and Western Libya clashes (2016–2018)
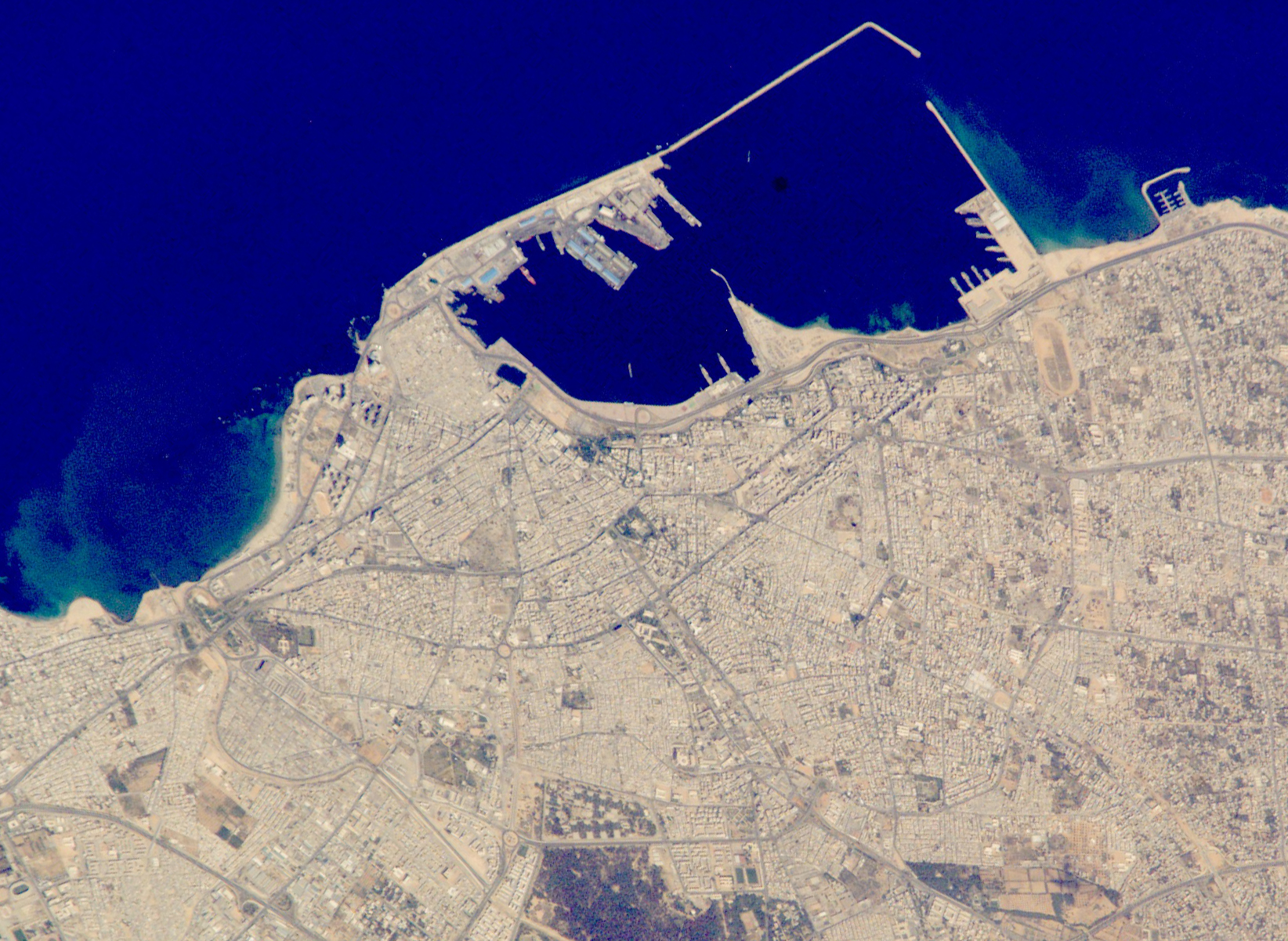
- Satellite image of central Tripoli, 2005
Date	27 August – 25 September 2018 (4 weeks and 1 day)
Location	Tripoli, Libya
Result	Ceasefire

Belligerents
(Libya) Seventh Brigade; Kani Militia; Somoud Brigade; Libyan Tribesmen	(Libya) Tripoli Brigade; Abu Salim Central Security Force; 301 Brigade; RADA; Nawassi Brigade; Libyan state guards	(Libya) Government of National Accord; National Oil Corporation Guards (Libya) Misrata Brigades

Commanders and leaders
(Libya) Mohsen al-Kani (leader of al-Kanni militia) (Libya) Abd al-Wahhab al-Magri (commander of the 7th -later renamed 9th- brigade) (Libya) Salah Badi (leader of Somoud brigade)	(Libya) Haitham Tajouri (Libya) Hashem Bishr (Libya) Abdelghani Al-Kikli (Abu Salim Central Security Force Commander)	(Libya) Fayez al-Sarraj (Libya) Abdussalam Ashour

Units involved
7th brigade Central support unit Somoud brigade	Tripoli brigade Special Deterrence Force Alnawasi brigade Joint Deterrence and Intervention Force Abu Salim 301st infantry brigade Bab Tajura Battalion Guarantee Battalion	anti-terrorism force

Casualties and losses
25+	32 militiamen killed	None
- 115 killed, 383 injured 25,000 civilians displaced

The Battle of Tripoli was a series of clashes in Tripoli, Libya from 27 August to 25 September 2018 during the Second Libyan Civil War. It was fought between several militias and was ended by a ceasefire.

== Prelude ==
Clashes between militias broke out in Tripoli from 26 to 27 August 2018, touching off renewed fighting in the city after 18 months of relative calm. The clashes pitted the 7th Brigade, originating from the town of Tarhuna, against three militias from Tripoli: Ghneiwa, the Tripoli Brigade and the Nawasi Brigade. All four militias were, however, officially affiliated to the Government of National Accord led by Fayez al-Sarraj.

Since 2016, Tripoli had been controlled by four militias: the Tripoli Brigade, the RADA Special Deterrence Forces, the Nawasi Brigade and Ghneiwa. RADA was Madkhalist and Salafist, while the other three groups did not profess any particular ideology. According to analysts Wolfram Lacher and Alaa al-Idrissi, these four militias formed a "cartel" monopolizing state resources while being protected by their support for the GNA. In June 2018, Lacher and al-Idrissi further stated that "such a situation is untenable" and "risks provoking a new major conflict started by political-military forces who feel excluded from this cartel in access to the levers of the administration." The August 2018 announcement of the reopening of Tripoli International Airport from having been damaged by warfare in 2014 aroused hostility from the 7th Brigade, which was excluded from the cartel and claimed that residents of Tarhuna had a right to a share of the revenues generated by the airport.

Jalel Harchaoui, a Libya expert at Paris 8 University Vincennes-Saint-Denis, reported that "the four or five largest Tripoli militias have provided relative security on a daily basis, which is appreciated by the population but also foreign states interested in maintaining a diplomatic and commercial presence to take advantage of reconstruction opportunities." However, "this situation was untenable" because the cities of Zintan and Misrata "felt excluded from this new balance of power." Militias from these cities had dominated Tripoli after the First Libyan Civil War until those from Zintan were expelled from the city in 2014, while those from Misrata withdrew in 2016 with the formation of the GNA.

The GNA and Prime Minister Fayez al-Sarraj, meanwhile, claimed that they had issued orders of dissolution to the 7th Brigade in April 2018, but RFI reported that the force continued to draw salaries before the Battle of Tripoli. The brigade soon declared that it was now part of the army and was aiming to "liberate" the capital. Some days after fighting began, the Somoud Brigade, an Islamist force from Misrata led by Salah Badi, intervened in support of the 7th Brigade.

== Battle ==
On 27 August, the 7th Brigade engaged several brigades from Tripoli on its way there from Tarhuna. Fighting first broke out in the neighbourhoods of Salah Eddine and Qasr bin Ghashir, south of Tripoli. On 31 August, Tripoli International Airport was closed after suffering damage from rocket fire. The same day, a ceasefire was announced, but it was not respected by belligerents. On 2 September, the GNA declared a state of emergency in the capital and its surrounding areas. 400 prisoners from Ain Zara Prison, south of Tripoli, took advantage of the fighting to escape the same day.

Various other groups then joined the battle, further complicating the situation. The GNA, meanwhile, lacked a formal military or real control over the warring militias. al-Sarraj then called upon brigades from Zintan and an "anti-terrorist brigade" from Misrata that had participated in the 2016 Battle of Sirte to intervene between the belligerents. On 2 September, the Misrata Brigades arrived on the outskirts of Tripoli. They did not immediately engage in combat but urged other militias to cede control of government buildings in the city centre. Still, new militias from Misrata and Zintan as well as smaller units loyal to Field Marshal Khalifa Haftar continued to reinforce the 7th Brigade.

On 4 September, the United Nations Support Mission in Libya announced the signing of a new ceasefire agreement between the armed groups in Tripoli. Nevertheless, fighting continued in the hours following the signing of the accords. On 6 September, Haftar threatened to march on Tripoli. The fragile truce was eventually respected by all parties. On 9 September, several armed groups agreed to cooperate on "consolidating" the ceasefire.

On 10 September, the headquarters of the National Oil Corporation was attacked by three to five armed men. Islamic State claimed responsibility for the incident. The building was subsequently recaptured by RADA, which reported that two attackers and two NOC employees had been killed.

On 12 November, rockets hit Mitiga International Airport, the only functional airport in Tripoli, which was controlled by RADA. All flights were cancelled, having previously been stopped from 31 August to 6 September.

In mid-September, UN Special Envoy to Libya Ghassam Salamé recorded 14 ceasefire violations in one week, although he still described it as "generally respected."

However, on 18 September, fighting resumed in southern Tripoli, causing power outages in the southern and western Libya. The main clashes took place in Salah Eddine and on the road to Tripoli International Airport. By 20 September, the fighting had killed nine people, including two civilians, and wounded 13, included four civilians.

On 25 September, a new ceasefire was signed between the Tarhuna and Tripoli militias and Mitiga International Airport was reopened. The agreement also mandated the formation of a mixed regular force composed of Tripoli and Tarhuna police to secure the southern suburb of Tripoli.

== Casualties ==
On 3 September 2018, the Ministry of Health published an official report recording at least 50 deaths and 138 people wounded since 27 August. On 8 September, the casualties reached at least 78 dead and 313 wounded. This increased to 115 dead and 400 wounded on 23 September. After the new ceasefire of 25 September, the toll was recorded as least 117 deaths and 400 wounded.

== Analysis ==
According to analyst Carlo Degli Abbati, "France's decision to accelerate the electoral process by fixing the [elections] date on 10 December increased tensions in the country and provoked a change in alliances for the 7th Brigade, a Tarhuna brigade that joined the side of Marshal Haftar. Having the wind in their sails due to their strong external support, they could have staged a coup d'état to take power. That's probably what just happened."

== Aftermath ==
Further combat occurred in Tripoli from 18 to 19 January, killing 10 people and wounding 41.

== Reactions ==
Supranational

- United Nations, UNSMIL has called for an end to the clashes as well a adherence to the cease-fire.
- European Union: The European Delegation to Libya condemned the violence, Being quoted as saying "The EU Delegation and the EU Heads of Mission to Libya strongly condemn the latest escalation of violence in Tripoli which has caused civilian fatalities, injury and displacement of people and destruction of critical infrastructure"

National

- United Kingdom, in August the British ambassador to Libya Frank Baker, wrote on Twitter, "Very concerned by the clashes in Tripoli. We call on all parties to cease military action, protect civilians, respect international law and engage in dialogue to de-escalate the situation Libya." In a joint statement with the United States, Italy and France, the nations expressed their concern for the situation and its potential to cause instability.
- France: The French minister of foreign affairs, Jean-Yves Le Drian, called for the UN security council to impose sanctions on the militias involved. He was quoted as saying "In the face of the worsening security situation in Tripoli, there is a responsibility to support the Libyans and that means we must be tougher on those that want to keep the status quo for their benefits"
- Italy: Minister of the Interior Matteo Salvini indirectly accused France of being responsible for the fighting in Tripoli.

Domestic

- (Libya) Government of National Accord: It recognized President Fayez al-Sarraj, who in a televised speech claimed that the 7th Brigade had been dissolved and called for respect of the cease-fire.
- (Libya) Libyan National Army: The head of the Libyan National Army, Khalifa Haftar, denied accusations of connections to the Tripoli militias. While also warning to intervene in the battle, Haftar was quoted as saying "When the time is right, we will move towards Tripoli."
