= Spillover of the Tigray war =

Spillover of the civil war in northern Ethiopia

- Part of the Tigray War and the Ethiopian civil conflict (2018–present)
| Location | East Africa, particularly in Ethiopia, Eritrea, Somalia and Sudan |
| Territorial changes | Sudan recaptures full control of Al-Fashaga |

Belligerents
| Ethiopia; Amhara Region; Afar Region; Benishangul-Gumuz; Gambela Region; Harari Region; Oromia; Sidama Region; Somali Region; SNNPR; Eritrea; Central Region; Somalia (alleged) | UFEFCF; Tigray Region; Supported by: Eritrean opposition (alleged); Sudan; African Union |

Units involved
| Ethiopian Armed Forces; Eritrean Defence Forces; Amhara militia; Afar militia; NISA (alleged); Liyu Police | Tigray Defense Forces; Oromo Liberation Army; Eritrean Islamic Jihad (alleged); Eritrean Liberation Front (alleged); Sudanese Armed Forces; AMISOM |

The spillover of the Tigray war has had an impact on other countries in the surrounding region, particularly in Sudan. This spillover mainly consisted of Ethiopian refugees, more than 50,000 of which have crossed the Ethiopia–Sudan border. There have also been border clashes, mostly between the Sudanese Armed Forces and Ethiopian militias, but the Sudanese government has also claimed ambushes by the Ethiopian National Defense Force have taken place. Most of the fighting centered in Al-Fashaqa, a fertile plain claimed by both Sudan and Ethiopia.

== Timeline ==
=== 2020 ===
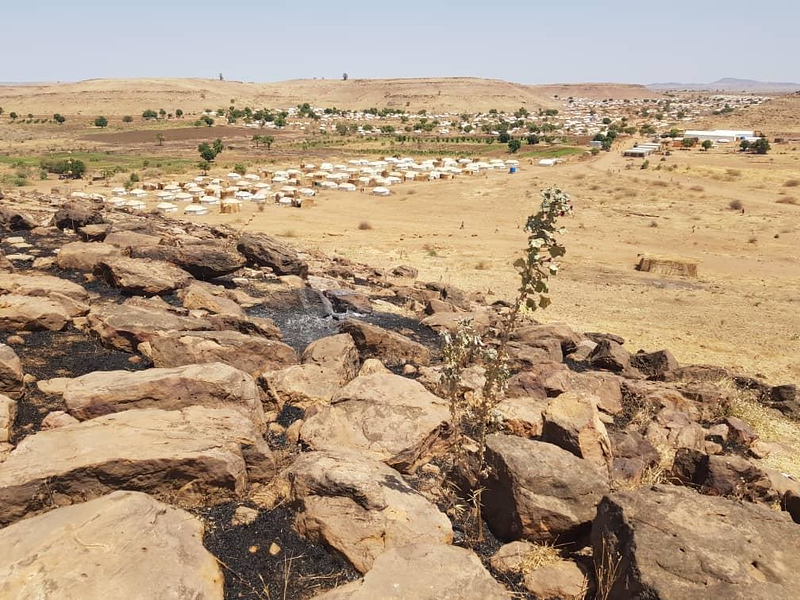
Tigrayan refugee camp in Sudan

- 28 December: Sudan says they retook 11 villages that were captured by Ethiopian militias.
- 28 December: Fighting in the town of Lilli after Amhara forces attacked, displaced 1,000 farmers.
- 31 December: Acting Sudanese Minister of Foreign Affairs Omer Ismail announced in a news conference that the Sudanese Armed Forces recaptured the remaining disputed territories of al-Fashqa district, which was previously settled by Amhara farmers.
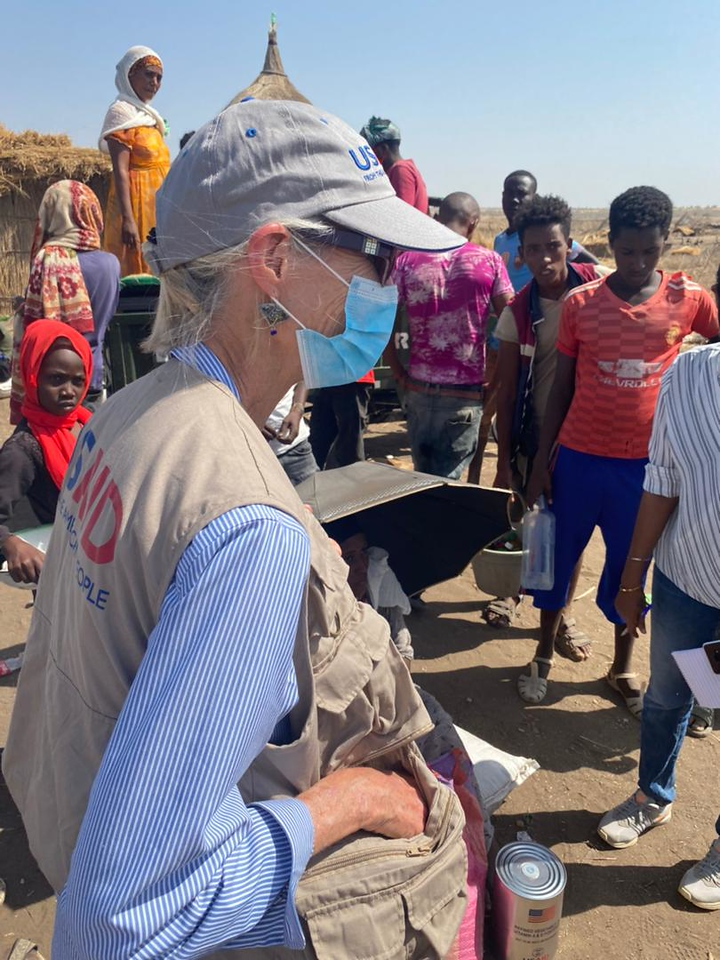
  A USAID worker in a Sudanese refugee camp

=== 2021 ===
- 2 January: Sudan sends reinforcement to the Ethiopian border.
- 3 January: Sudan arrested 45 TPLF fighters that crossed over into Sudan.
- 4 January: Amhara militias from Ethiopia kidnapped and killed an unknown number of herders in Sudan.
- 6 January: Sudan says they repelled two attacks from Ethiopia and captured an Ethiopian soldier.
- 9 January: Ethiopia built a fence to stop refugees from crossing into Sudan.
- 11 January: Ethiopian forces infiltrated five kilometers into Sudanese territory, killing six civilians.
- 13 January: A Sudanese Mil Mi-24 helicopter crashes near the Ethiopian border.
- 13 January: An Ethiopian military aircraft crossed the Ethiopia–Sudan border.
- 13 January: Sudanese military captured nine Ethiopian Military camps inside Ethiopia.
- 18 January: A cross border attack by a militia from Ethiopia killed two shepherds in Gallabat. The attackers stole 250 sheep in the attack.
- 20 January: An Ethiopian militia group attacked five kilometers into Sudan destroying a car and injuring a farmer, the attack displaced 25 people.
- 24 January: Ethiopia fired mortar shells at a Sudanese patrol, causing Sudan to respond with their own mortar shelling in eastern Al-Gadaref province.
- 28 January: Ethiopia started deploying artillery, tanks, and anti aircraft systems to the border with Sudan.
- 30 January: Ethiopian militias kidnapped 3 merchants in the Basindah area causing Sudan to deploy military reinforcements to the area.
- 14 February: Sudan said Ethiopian soldiers crossed into its territory. The Ethiopian Ministry of Foreign Affairs said that Sudan had been plundering and displacing Ethiopian citizens since 6 November 2020 and that the Sudanese army should evacuate the area that it has forcefully occupied. Ethiopia has also accused Sudan of crossing into its territory.
- 20 February: The Sudanese Ministry of Foreign Affairs claimed that Eritrean forces had entered into the al-Fashaga region with Ethiopian forces. Four days later on 24 February, Eritrea denied the involvement of its forces in the tensions on the Sudanese-Ethiopian borders. Stating that it wished for a peaceful solution to the conflict and that his government understands Sudan's position regarding its right to extend its sovereignty over its land.
- 23 February: Ethiopia asked Sudan to withdraw its troops from the disputed border area before peace talks could begin. The Ethiopian Ministry of Foreign Affairs spokesperson, Dina Mufti, said that Ethiopia does not want to enter into conflict with Sudan again. He also said that Ethiopia wished to return to the 2008 compromise which would allow Ethiopian troops and civilians enter region undisturbed. Finally Mufti said there was a third party who pushed Sudan to enter into conflict with Ethiopia. The same day Sudan stated that it would not withdraw its troops from the border region and said the deployment of the Sudanese army on the border strip with Ethiopia is a final and irreversible decision.
- 2 March: The Sudanese army continued to push in the last Ethiopian stronghold of Bereket in the disputed border region of al-Fashaga against Ethiopian-backed forces. In the meantime, Sudan claimed Eritrean forces were helping the Ethiopians.
- 3 April: Sudan closed the Gallabat-Metemma border crossing with Ethiopia, two days after Ethiopian militiamen attacked Sudanese customs officials in presence of the Ethiopian military.
- 8 April: Walid Ahmad al-Sajjan, commander of the Fifth Brigade of the Sudanese Armed Forces in Umm Barakit, stated that the Sudanese military had retaken 95% of the disputed al-Fashaga region from Ethiopia.
- 13 April: Sudan released 61 Ethiopian soldiers it had captured and handed them to the Ethiopian government through the Gallabat border crossing.
- 23 July: Three children of the Fellata tribe were kidnapped by Ethiopian militias from an area near Gallabat and Metemma. Sudanese captain Bahaa El-Din Youssef, commander of the Gallabat Military Region, was later captured while pursuing the militia behind the kidnapping.
- Sudan closed the Gallabat border crossing again on 24 July.
- 26 September: Sudan's military stated that Ethiopian forces had tried to capture the Umm Barakit area a day earlier, but were forced to withdraw after a confrontation.
- 27 November: At least 20 Sudanese soldiers have been killed in an ambush by Ethiopian forces near the border.

=== 2022 ===
- 26 June: The Sudanese Armed Forces claims Ethiopia executed seven Sudanese soldiers and a civilian who were captives. To which the Ethiopian ministry of affairs said that the incident was carried out by Sudanese troops with the support of the TPLF.
- 29 June: The TPLF dismissed allegations of being involved in the execution of the Sudanese soldiers and a civilian.

== Spillover locations ==
=== Within Ethiopia ===
Within Ethiopia, lots of fighting has happened outside the Tigray Region. For instance, heavy fighting has occurred in the Afar Region. The Oromo conflict and second insurgency in Ogaden have both been supported by the TPLF as well.

=== Eritrea ===
Eritrea, despite its history of negative relations with Ethiopia, has been fighting in the Tigray Region alongside Ethiopian forces. Eritrea currently occupies territory in Tigray.

=== South Sudan ===
On 29 November 2020, claims that South Sudan was giving safe haven to Debretsion led to the Ethiopian ambassador to South Sudan abruptly returning to Ethiopia, and South Sudanese diplomats in Ethiopia allegedly being given 72 hours to leave the country.

=== Sudan ===
Many clashes have occurred on the border between Ethiopia and Sudan as forces on both sides have fought over border regions. Sudan has also fought against Tigray forces that entered Sudanese territory.

=== Somalia ===
On 7 December 2020, heavy fighting broke out between African Union Mission to Somalia and Ethiopian troops in Halgan District, Somalia, when Ethiopian troops tried to disarm Tigrayan troops within their ranks. In total, 21 Ethiopian soldiers of Tigrayan origin and 20 other Ethiopian soldiers were killed in the internal military mutiny.

== Refugees ==
Throughout the Tigray War, more than 60,000 Ethiopian refugees have fled to Sudan. The United Nations operates several refugee camps in Sudan, including camps at Um Rakuba, Tunaydbah, and Hamdayet. The refugees are largely Tigrayan with an Amhara minority.
