= Ethiopia–Sudan relations =

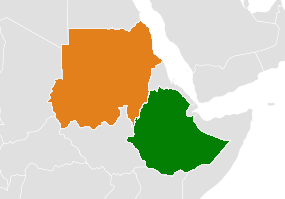

- Ethiopia: Sudan

Ethiopia–Sudan relations date back to antiquity. One of Ethiopia's principal trade routes ran west to Sudan and then to Egypt and the Mediterranean. Muslim merchants from Sudan have been an important part of Ethiopia's trade for many centuries.

== History ==
Relations between Ethiopia and Sudan have not always been cordial. The Funj Sultanate defeated Ethiopia at the Battle of the Dindar River. Military conflict also broke out between Ethiopians and Sudanese in the 1850s. Sudanese Mahdists, or dervishes as they also were called, then advanced into Ethiopia in 1885, resulting in a series of battles between Sudanese Muslims and Ethiopian Christians over the next four years.

Relations improved during the twentieth century. Emperor Haile Selassie, who had been in exile during the 1936–41 Italian occupation of Ethiopia, returned with the help of Ethiopian, British, and Sudanese forces from Sudan. Relations became tense again in the late 1950s as Ethiopia supported the South Sudanese Anya Nya rebels in their battle against Khartoum. Selassie, however, helped broker the 1972 Addis Ababa Agreement that ended the first civil war between North and South.

Ethiopia's military government under Mengistu Haile Mariam (1974–91) strongly supported the SPLM/A against the government in Khartoum. The successor Tigray-dominated government, when it operated as a rebel movement, often took refuge in Sudan during its struggle to overthrow Mengistu. After taking power in 1991, it established cordial relations with Khartoum. This era of cooperation faded quickly as Islamic militants in Sudan tried to export their ideas to neighboring countries, including Ethiopia. Sudan's relations with Ethiopia reached a low in 1995 following Sudanese complicity in the attempted assassination of Egyptian president Hosni Mubarak as he was visiting Addis Ababa. The assassination incident and its aftermath was used by both Egypt and Ethiopia to seize lands in Sudan in 1995 (Halaib triangle on the border with Egypt and al-Fashaga on the border with Ethiopia respectively).

Concurrently, at the urging of the United States, Ethiopia and Eritrea joined Uganda in the so-called Front Line States strategy, which was designed to put military pressure on Khartoum. In 1997 Ethiopian forces joined the SPLA in a cross-border attack that resulted in the capture of the border town of Kurmuk and a second small town in Sudan's Blue Nile State.

Ethiopia normalized relations with Sudan by the end of 1998.

As of 2011, good relations between Sudan and Ethiopia continued in spite of Sudan's improved ties with Eritrea. Sudanese President Omar al-Bashir visited Addis Ababa twice in 2001. During a visit to Khartoum in 2002, Ethiopia's prime minister, Meles Zenawi, hailed Ethiopian–Sudanese ties. The two countries agreed to cancel entry visas and fees on traded commodities, and they stepped up plans to increase trade. Ethiopia began early in 2003 to import oil from Sudan. By 2009 Sudan supplied 80 percent of Ethiopia's demand for oil. The two nations signed an agreement ending a dispute involving their 1,600-kilometer border, and landlocked Ethiopia made plans to make greater use of Port Sudan as a transshipment point. Ethiopia, Sudan, and Yemen formed a regional group early in 2003 that they said was designed to “combat terrorism” in the Horn of Africa. In May 2010, Meles attended the swearing-in ceremony in Khartoum for al-Bashir following his election.

Bilateral relations among countries in the Horn of Africa tended to be fickle. However, Ethiopia and Sudan continued to make progress on settling border issues. The Ethiopian prime minister and Sudanese president inaugurated a major new road link between Ethiopia and Sudan at the end of 2007. There were frequent subsequent exchange visits by Ethiopian and Sudanese leaders. Ethiopia remained wary, however, of any effort by Sudan to return to a policy supporting Islamist militancy in the region. Although Ethiopia preferred a united Sudan, it shored up its relations with South Sudan on the assumption that it would opt for secession. Sudan, Ethiopia, and Eritrea were periodic recipients of refugees from the other countries, another potential cause of friction. Agreement on usage of Nile River water reemerged as an important issue between Addis Ababa and Khartoum, while Asmara supported the Sudanese position as another way to irritate Ethiopia. Ethiopia desired a revision of the 1959 water-sharing agreement that involved only Egypt and Sudan. Although not entirely happy with the 1959 agreement, Sudan wanted to leave the water-sharing provision in place. However, Sudan had cited its concern over the Grand Ethiopian Renaissance Dam, which was built on the Blue Nile River in Ethiopia, as it would affect the safety of the Sudanese dams, despite prospects for development in the region.

=== Border clashes ===
On 22 December 2020, Sudan and Ethiopia commenced talks in the Sudanese capital Khartoum to demarcate their border in Ethiopia's Tigray region. The talks come following fighting between Sudanese Army and Ethiopian Shifta forces on farmlands in the border area, as well as following the tens of thousands of Ethiopians who fled into Sudan in November, as a result of the Tigray conflict.

In January 2021, tensions again spiked as Sudan accused Ethiopia of escalating the border conflict around valuable farmland in the Tigray border region. These accusations come in light of Ethiopia's decision to fill the Grand Ethiopian Renaissance Dam by July 2021, a move which Sudan claims was taken unilaterally, and which could endanger Sudan's own water systems.

On Saturday 27 November 2021, six Sudanese soldiers were killed in an attack by Ethiopian forces on a Sudanese army post near the border between the countries, Sudanese military sources told Reuters. Sudan's army said in an earlier statement on Facebook that “groups of the Ethiopian army and militias attacked its forces in Al-Fashaga Al-sughra, which resulted in deaths … our forces valiantly repelled the attack and inflicted heavy losses in lives and equipment on the attackers.”

=== Post Sudanese civil war ===
Since April 2023, Relations between Ethiopia and Sudan sharply deteriorated after the outbreak of the Sudanese civil war in April 2023, as the government of Abiy Ahmed in Addis Ababa was accused by Khartoum of indirectly supporting the Rapid Support Forces (RSF) through cooperation with the United Arab Emirates. Reports by Reuters in February 2026 alleged that Ethiopia hosted a secret training camp for RSF fighters in the Benishangul-Gumuz region during joint RSF and SPlM-N's offensive in Blue Nile State near the Sudanese border, with Emirati financing, logistical support, and drone infrastructure linked to nearby Asosa airport.

In May 2026, Sudan formally accused Ethiopia and the UAE of orchestrating drone attacks on Khartoum International Airport and military installations in the capital, describing the strikes as “direct aggression” against Sudanese sovereignty. Sudanese Armed Forces commander Abdel Fattah al-Burhan alleged that drones used in the attack originated from Bahir Dar airport in Ethiopia and accused the government of Abiy Ahmed of facilitating military assistance to the Rapid Support Forces, including drone support aimed at Khartoum airport.

The accusations deepened fears that the Sudanese civil war had evolved into a wider regional proxy conflict involving Ethiopia, United Arab Emirates, Egypt, and Eritrea, with Addis Ababa allegedly viewing the RSF as a counterweight to the Sudanese army’s alignment with Cairo and Asmara. Investigations by Reuters, the BBC, The Guardian, and regional analysts linked the UAE to extensive financial and military backing for the Rapid Support Forces, including alleged arms transfers, logistics networks, and support infrastructure operating through Ethiopian territory.
