= Tripoli clashes =

Tripoli clashes may refer to:

- Tripoli protests and clashes (February 2011)
- Tripoli clashes (mid-October 2011)
- 2022 Tripoli clashes
- 2023 Tripoli clashes
- 2025 Tripoli clashes
