= Public Security Service (Libya) =

- جهاز الأمن العام
- Active: July 2018-now
- Country: Libya
- Allegiance: Ministry of Interior (Libya), Government of National Unity (Libya)
- Branch: Libyan Army
- Type: Infantry
- Role: Security Force
- Part of: Tripoli Military Region
- Garrison/HQ: General Tobacco Company, Ghot Alsha'al, Tripoli

The Public Security Service (PSS) is a Libyan militia and state security agency under the Ministry of Interior. Its main duties include maintaining internal security, combating organized crime, and enforcing public order laws across Libya.

== History ==
The Public Security Service evolved from the Special Operations Force, which included former members of the Al-Sawaiq Brigade from Zintan, west of Tripoli, and new recruits. The groups commander, Major Imad Trabelsi, founded the force after the Al-Sawaiq Brigade’s defeat by Libya Dawn forces.

In July 2018, the Government of National Accord renamed the group the General Security and Security Centers Service and appointed Trabelsi as commander. The force established control over several areas west of Tripoli. Its main headquarters was set up in a former tobacco factory in Ghout al-Shaal, where it remains as of 2024.

The Public Security Service operates alongside the Internal Security Agency (ISA) and the Special Deterrence Forces (RADA). Its central command is based in Tripoli.

== Controversies ==
The Public Security Service has been criticized by international human rights organizations for alleged violations. These include accusations of arbitrary detention, enforced disappearances, and mistreatment of detainees. The agency has also been linked to the management of migrant detention centers such as Al Mabani in Tripoli, where widespread abuse of migrants has been documented. Reports describe severe overcrowding, physical violence, extortion, forced labor, and killings.

In 2021, a major incident at Al Mabani resulted in the death of Guinean migrant Aliou Candé after guards opened fire into a packed cell. Despite public outcry, including from international aid organizations, accountability for such abuses remains absent. Libya’s ongoing conflict and fragmented security landscape have made oversight and enforcement difficult.
