= Abdussalam Ashour =

Libyan security officer

Brigadier General Abdussalam Ashour is a Libyan security officer who served as the Minister of Interior in the Government of National Accord (GNA) from 16 February 2018 to 7 October 2018. Ashour replaced Al-Aref al-Khoga due to his predecessor's poor health. During his tenure, the GNA struggled to secure the Libyan capital Tripoli as various militias outnumber the government's regular forces. Ashour was replaced by Fathi Bashagha after the fighting between militias in Tripoli, a leader from Misrata connected with armed groups there.
