= 444th Infantry Brigade (Libya) =

- لواء المشاة 444
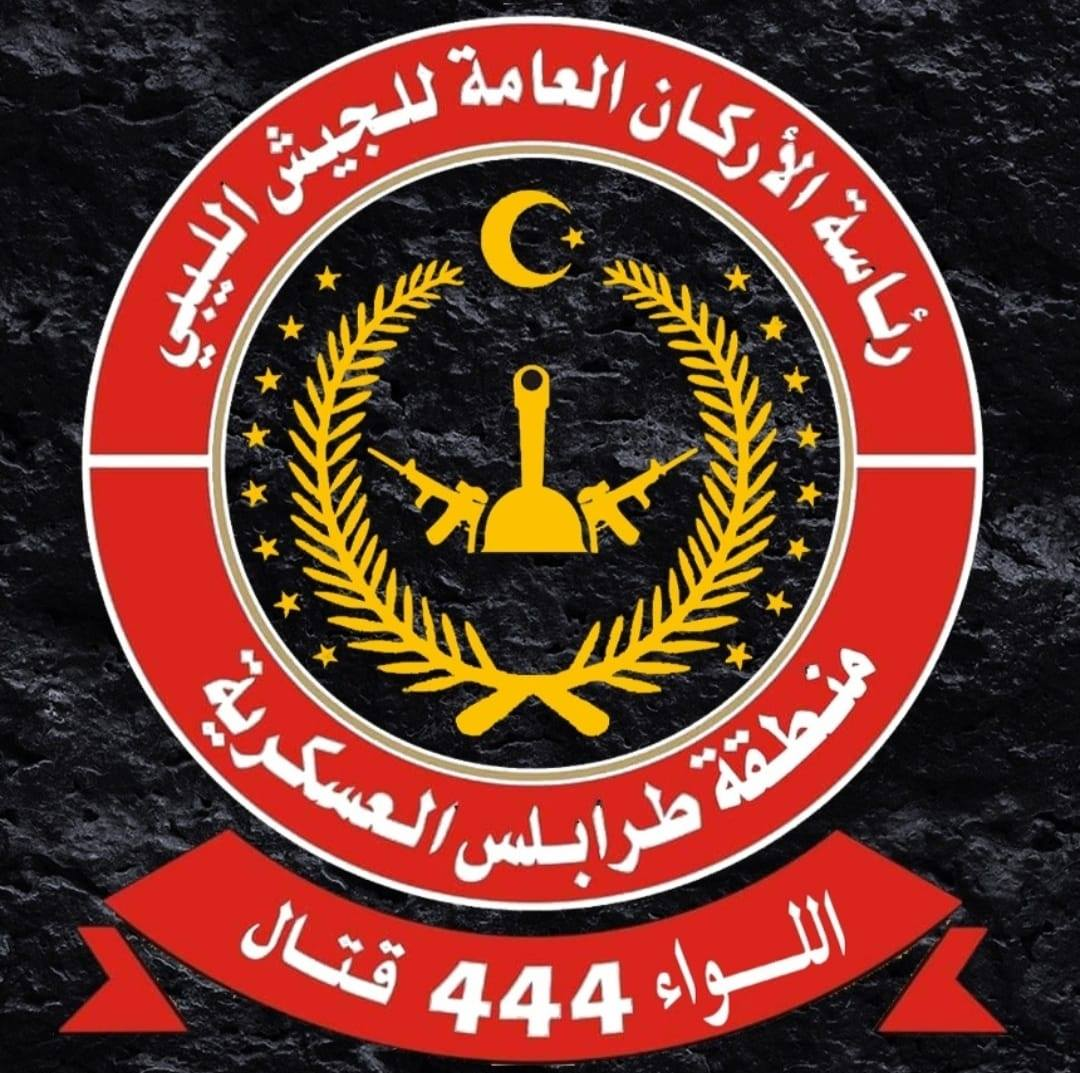
- Active: 2021–present
- Country: Libya
- Allegiance: Ministry of Defence (Libya), Government of National Unity (Libya)
- Branch: Libyan Army
- Type: Infantry
- Role: Combat, rapid-response and internal security; counter-smuggling, counter-trafficking, desert operations, and protection of strategic infrastructure
- Part of: General Staff of the Libyan Army
- Garrison/HQ: Al-Takbali camp, Tripoli
- Engagements: 2023 Tripoli clashes, 2025 Tripoli clashes

Commanders
- Current commander: Major General Mahmoud Hamza

The 444th Combat Brigade is a military unit operating under the Libyan Government of National Unity (GNU). It is based in Tripoli and is known for its structured command and operations against smuggling, organized crime, and human trafficking. The brigade operates mainly in urban areas and southern desert regions of Libya.

== Clashes and conflicts ==
The 444th Combat Brigade has been involved in major clashes reflecting Libya's fragile security situation. In August 2023, fighting erupted with the Special Deterrence Force (RADA) after the detention of brigade commander Mahmoud Hamza, resulting in over 50 fatalities in Tripoli.

In May 2025, the brigade led operations against the Stability Support Apparatus (SSA) following the assassination of SSA leader Abdel Ghani al-Kikli. These operations were supported by the Ministry of Defence, which later declared full control over contested areas of Tripoli.

== Structure and leadership ==
The brigade is commanded by Major General Mahmoud Hamza. It operates within the Tripoli Military Zone but retains significant operational autonomy. It often coordinates with other government-aligned units in joint security missions.

- 1st Battalion
- 2nd Battalion
- 3rd Battalion
- 124th Airborne Battalion

== Allegations of human rights violations ==
The 444 Combat Brigade has faced repeated allegations from local and international organizations regarding human rights violations, which the brigade's leadership has denied on multiple occasions.

In November 2025, the Libya Crimes Watch organization documented the injury of at least five civilians in the Ain Zara district of Tripoli by bullet shrapnel during live-fire military exercises conducted by the brigade at a camp located near a residential area. In its monthly report, the organization held the Military Intelligence Directorate and the 444 Brigade, both affiliated with the Ministry of Defense, legally responsible for several documented violations.

Additionally, the Prime Minister of the interim Government of National Stability government, Osama Hammad, accused the brigade of committing "systematic violations" in the city of Tarhuna, including kidnapping, enforced disappearance, and terrorizing families outside the legal framework, calling on the Attorney General to open an urgent investigation. Members of the brigade were also accused of firing indiscriminately at a crowd inside the Tarhuna Municipal Stadium, which resulted in the injury of a spectator and the death of a soldier by friendly fire. The National Council for Civil Liberties and Human Rights described the incident as a gross violation of international humanitarian law.

Amnesty International expressed its concern over large-scale military operations carried out by armed factions in Tripoli, in which the brigade participated alongside other groups. Furthermore, critics accused the brigade of turning a blind eye to the transgressions of groups associated with it, including the "Kaniyat militia" in Tarhuna. A United Nations fact-finding mission concluded that there were reasonable grounds to believe its members committed crimes against humanity, including extermination, torture, and enforced disappearance, up until mid-2020, before the brigade later announced the arrest of several members implicated in killings and mass executions.

In response, the brigade's commander, Mahmoud Hamza, denied these allegations, asserting that the unit has never engaged in unlawful practices, and refuting reports concerning the establishment of secret prisons or the commission of violations against civilians.
