= Supreme Security Committee =

Supreme Security Committee may refer to:

- Supreme Security Committee of the Ministry of Interior (Libya), formed after the 2011 civil war
- Supreme Security Committee (Yemen), formed by Houthi rebels after the 2015 Houthi takeover in Yemen
