= Al-Aref al-Khoga =

Aref al-Khodja

Minister of Interior
- In office May 2014 – 15 February 2018
- Prime Minister: Ahmed Maiteeq; Fayez al-Sarraj
- Preceded by: Umar al-Sinki
- Succeeded by: Abdussalam Ashour

Aref al-Khodja is a Libyan political leader who was the Minister of Interior of Libya in the Government of National Accord. He is an Islamist and held the post of interior minister in the Tripoli-based government, the General National Congress. Al-Khoga has a police background.
