= Stability Support Apparatus (Libya) =

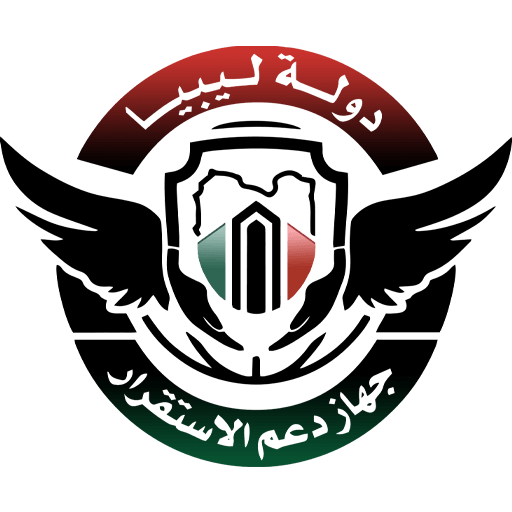
- Active: 2012–2021 as Abu Salim Brigade; 2021–2025 as Stability Support Apparatus
- Country: Libya
- Allegiance: Ministry of Interior (Libya), Government of National Unity (Libya)
- Branch: Libyan Army
- Type: Infantry
- Part of: Tripoli Military Region
- Garrison/HQ: Al-Falah, Tripoli
- Engagements: 2023 Tripoli clashes, 2025 Tripoli clashes

Commanders
- Current commander: Abdel Ghani al-Kikli X

The Stability Support Apparatus (SSA) was a Libyan security body formally established in 2021 by the Ministry of Interior of the National Unity Government. It evolved from the Abu Salim Brigade, a powerful militia active in Tripoli since 2012. It was dissolved in May of 2025, after the assassination of Abdel Ghani Al Kikli.

== History and disposition ==
The Abu Salim Brigade, later known as SSA, was founded in 2012 by Abdel-Ghani Al-Kakli, a civilian participant in the February 2011 revolution. The group initially operated from Abu Salim, the largest district of Tripoli, and expanded its control to nearby areas.

The Abu Salim Brigade was involved in several armed operations throughout Tripoli, including Bab Ben Ghashir, Sharqiya, Al-Hadba, and the area of the former Ministry of Interior. The brigade worked closely with local authorities and received ongoing financial support, weapons, and payment.

In mid-2021, the Ministry of Interior rebranded the Abu Salim Brigade as the Stability Support Apparatus (SSA). This gave the SSA the right to set up branches outside Tripoli, including in Sabratha and Al-Zawiya.

On May 12 2025, during a meeting with leaders affiliated with the GNU at a base of their rival militia, the 444th Infantry Brigade, its leader Abdel Ghani Al Kikli, was assassinated under mysterious circumstances, leading to clashes between the SSA and the 444th. His assassination triggered the dissolution of the SSA and the takeover of all its bases by the Ministry of Defense, which the 444th Brigade is heavily integrated with.

== Activities ==
The SSA uses official social media to report on operations targeting illegal migration, smuggling, and crime.
