= Al-Siddiq Al-Sour =

- الصديق الصور
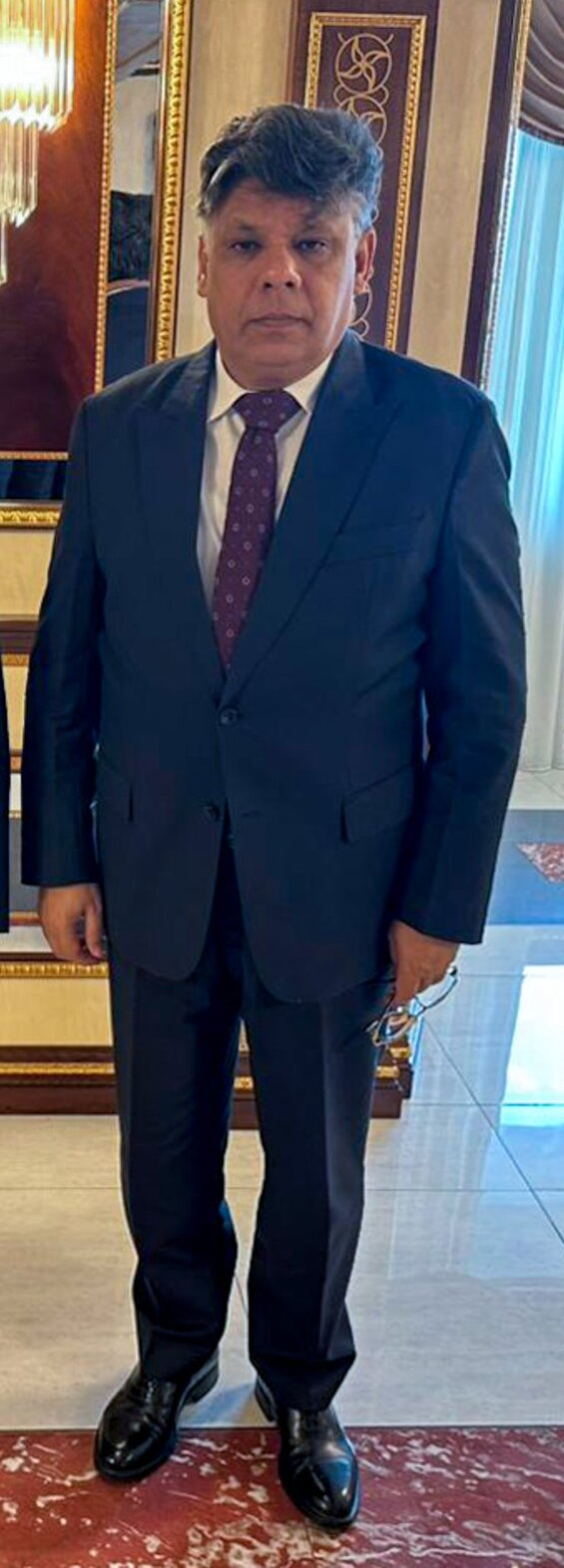

Attorney General of Libya
- Incumbent
- Assumed office April 20, 2021
- President: Mohamed al-Menfi
- Prime Minister: Abdul Hamid Dbeibeh

Head of the Investigations Department at the Attorney General's Office
- Incumbent
- Assumed office March 20, 2013
- Prime Minister: Ali Zeidan
- Preceded by: Ibrahim Ashour Al-Ageli

Vice President of the Supreme Judicial Council
- Incumbent
- Assumed office December 21, 2021
- President: Mohamed al-Menfi
- Prime Minister: Abdul Hamid Dbeibeh
- Preceded by: Abdel-Qader Radwan

Personal details
- Born: Misrata, Libya

Al-Siddiq Al-Sour (Arabic: الصديق الصور) is a Libyan judge and legal official from the city of Misrata. He has served as the Attorney General of Libya since April 20, 2021, and as the Vice President of the Supreme Judicial Council since December 21, 2021. He previously held the position of Head of the Investigations Department at the Attorney General's Office starting March 20, 2013. He was elected to the post of Attorney General by the House of Representatives, during the tenure of the Government of National Unity headed by Abdul Hamid Dbeibeh.

== Professional career ==
- Worked as a prosecutor in the city of Misrata.
- Appointed as the Head of the Investigations Department at the Office of the Attorney General.
- Appointed as the Attorney General of Libya on April 26, 2021.
- Appointed as the Vice President of the Supreme Judicial Council on December 21, 2021.

== See also ==
- Attorney General Office (Libya)
