= 2025 Tripoli clashes =

2025 conflict in the Libyan capital

- Part of The Libyan crisis
| Date | 12 – 19 May 2025 (7 days) |
| Location | Tripoli, Libya |
| Status | Truce; Firearm ceasefire: Ceasefire announced on 14 May; Establishment of a "truce committee" by UNSMIL and the Libyan Presidential Council on 19 May; Civil unrest and protests against the Dbeibah government.; GNU appoints new head of Internal Security Agency.; GNU disbands the Directorate for Combatting Illegal Migration. |

Belligerents
| Libya ( Government of National Unity): 444th Infantry Brigade; 111th Brigade Majhfal | Stability Support Apparatus; Libya Shield Force | Special Deterrence Forces |

Commanders and leaders
| Abdul Hamid Dbeibeh; Mahmoud Hamza | Abdel Ghani al-Kikli X | Abdulrauf Kara |

Casualties and losses
| At least 1 killed | At least 1 militant killed | Unknown |
- At least 8 civilians killed, 70+ wounded 38 Maltese civilians evacuated

On 12 May 2025, clashes broke out in Tripoli, Libya, between the 444th Infantry Brigade and the Stability Support Apparatus (SSA). The fighting began after SSA commander Abdel Ghani al-Kikli was assassinated. This is the first major armed clash in Tripoli since the 2023 Tripoli clashes.

On 14 May 2025, a ceasefire was announced with the fighting easing but still occurring. Libya's defense ministry said the ceasefire began in all areas of tension in Tripoli as part of efforts "to protect civilians, preserve state institutions, and avoid further escalation."

== Clashes ==
The clashes broke out at about 9:00 p.m. after the assassination of Stability Support Apparatus (SSA) commander Abdul Ghani al-Kikli, referred to as "Ghaniwa" and several of his escorts during a meeting reportedly convened to de-escalate mounting tensions among armed factions at the Tekbali military camp, but guards from rival group 444th Brigade exchanged fire outside of the gathering.

After the GNU retained control of their territories, more fighting broke out late May 13 and the early hours of May 14th between the RADA Special Deterrence Forces and the 444th Brigade. Civilians reported hearing gunshots and explosions around midnight along with armed militant groups being deployed. Militia groups from neighboring Zawiya reportedly joined the fighting in support of the Special Deterrence Forces. Major fighting took place near the Al Jadida prison, where inmates were reported to have escaped during the fighting. Authorities had announced a ceasefire May 14, although gunshots were still heard in western Tripoli. The 444th Brigade reportedly took control of the Port of Tripoli, the Rajma headquarters, the al-Ruwaimi prison, Ain Zara, al-Jadidah and the headquarters of the Illegal Immigration Agency.

On May 15, an armed group linked to the Government of National Accord (GNA) opened fire on protesters demanding a ceasefire and the government's resignation, causing an unknown number of casualties. Earlier, unknown assailants attempted to assassinate Ali al-Jabbari, leader of an armed group affiliated with the GNA. Residents reported heavy clashes and gunfire occurred at multiple places in Tripoli, with dozens of vehicles carrying militia fighters in the streets. Videos showed military convoys from Misrata's Joint Force and Zintan-based units loyal to Interior Minister Imed Trabelsi moving toward Tripoli. Flights at Mitiga International Airport were suspended, schools were cancelled and districts were deserted. Firefights were reported to be especially intense in the neighborhoods of Abu Salim and Salah Eddin.

Once fighting had slowed, protests began in the RADA-controlled Souq el-Joumaa neighborhood, with more than 500 people expressing disdain with the Dbeibeh government. A security personnel for the GNU was killed during the protests, when protesters attempted to storm his office.

On 19 May, the UNSMIL and the Libyan Presidential Council a "truce committee" chaired by Mohamed Al-Haddad, the Chief of General Staff of the Libyan Army, to oversee the ceasefire.

On May 24, protests resumed in Tripoli and Zawiya, calling for an end to the Government of National Unity headed by Abdul Hamid Dabaiba, the departure of all political bodies, and the dissolution of all armed militias, also calling the UN mission in Libya to intervene and provide assistance. They threatened to continue the escalation and shut down all government institutions within 24 hours. But nothing seems to have happened after the deadline.

== Reactions ==
The interior ministry of the Libyan Government of National Unity (GNU) requested civilians shelter in place during the fighting for their own safety. The GNU also said on its media platform that the Ministry of Defence had fully taken control of the Abu Salim neighbourhood. The United Nations Support Mission in Libya (UNSMIL) released a statement on 12 May that they were alarmed by the situation, commenting specifically on the intense fighting involving heavy weaponry in urban centers. They further called for an immediate ceasefire and urged both sides to protect civilians, additionally calling on community elders and leaders to de-escalate the situation. Ibrahim al-Khalifi, the mayor of Tripoli, confirmed that gunfire had largely subsided by early Tuesday but said movement in many neighbourhoods remained halted.

- United Nations Mission: The mission in Libya urged calm amidst reports of escalating tensions in the capital, stating, "Reports indicate military mobilization and rising tensions in Tripoli and the western region in general." The mission called on all parties to de-escalate immediately.
- U.S. Embassy in Libya: The embassy joined the United Nations Support Mission in Libya in calling for calm.
- Turkish Embassy in Libya: The embassy advised its citizens residing in the capital, Tripoli, to exercise caution and issued an official notice urging them to adhere to the Ministry of Interior's advisory from the Government of National Unity to avoid leaving their homes unless absolutely necessary.
- Bangladeshi Embassy in Libya: The embassy urged its citizens in Libya to "take necessary precautions and stay at home due to the situation in the capital."

== See also ==
- 2022 Tripoli clashes
- 2023 Tripoli clashes
