= Abdel Ghani al-Kikli =

Libyan military leader (died 2025)

Abdul Ghani Al-Kikli
- Born: 1967; Benghazi, Libya
- Died: 12 May 2025 (aged 57); Tripoli, Libya
- Cause of death: Assassination
- Citizenship: Libyan

Abdul Ghani Belkacem Khalifa Al-Kikli (Arabic: عبد الغني بلقاسم خليفة الككلي) known as Ghnewa Al-Kikli (Arabic: غنيوة الككلي; 1967 – May 2025) was a Libyan commander and head of the Stability Support Department affiliated with the Libyan Presidential Council. After the fall of the previous regime, he formed an armed militia known as the Central Security and became one of the influential figures in the capital, Tripoli.

== Early life ==
Al-Kikli was born in the east, in Benghazi, and moved with his family to Tripoli as a child, where he worked in a bakery. He was imprisoned for his involvement in criminal activities and sentenced to 14 years in Al-Jadida Prison, where he remained until February 2011 when the civil war broke out.

== Death ==
Al-Kikli was killed in an incident in Tripoli inside a facility run by a rival militia called the 444 Brigade, commanded by Mahmoud Hamza, on 12 May 2025. His death triggered clashes between the SSA and the 444 Brigade across Tripoli that left at least six people dead.
