= 2023 Tripoli clashes =

August 2023 conflict in the Libyan capital

- Part of the Libyan Crisis
| Date | 14 August to 15 August 2023 |
| Location | Tripoli, Libya |
| Result | Truce; Firearm ceasefire: Mahmoud Hamza (444th brigade leader) released; 444th brigade maintain control of all areas |

Belligerents
| 444th Infantry Brigade | RADA Special Deterrence Forces |

Commanders and leaders
| Mahmoud Hamza | Abdulrauf Kara |

Strength
| Unknown | Unknown |
- At least 55 people were killed and 146 others injured

In August 2023, clashes broke out in Tripoli, Libya, between the Special Deterrence Force (RADA) and the 444th Combat Brigade, two of the strongest military forces in the city. Both had supported the provisional Government of National Unity during the 2022 Tripoli clashes. Fighting erupted on 14 August when RADA fighters detained 444th Brigade commander Mahmoud Hamza and lasted until 15 August, which forced the city's main airport to close. At least 55 people were reported dead. This was the deadliest armed clash of 2023 in Tripoli.

== See also ==
- 2022 Tripoli clashes
- 2025 Tripoli clashes
