= Attorney General Office (Libya) =

Office of the Attorney General
- مكتب النائب العام

Agency overview
- Formed: 1953
- Jurisdiction: Libyan Judicial Authority
- Headquarters: Tripoli, Libya; 32.886479°N 13.187870°E
- Annual budget: 35,000,000 LYD (Chapter I); 50,000,000 LYD (Chapter II)
- Website: attorneygeneral.gov.ly

Attorney General Office (Arabic: مكتب النائب العام) is the highest authority within the public prosecution hierarchy in Libya and constitutes a key component of the state's judicial system. The office represents society and its interests, holding the exclusive jurisdiction to initiate and conduct criminal proceedings. The office is headed by the Attorney General, a position currently held by Counselor Al-Siddiq Al-Sour.

== Establishment and legal framework ==
The Office of the Attorney General sits at the apex of the public prosecution, an independent judicial body responsible for investigating and prosecuting crimes. The office derives its legitimacy and authority from the state's fundamental laws, notably the Libyan Penal Code and the Code of Criminal Procedure. The Attorney General is the supreme official overseeing all members of the public prosecution, including advocates general, chief prosecutors, and prosecutors, exercising administrative and legal supervision over them.

== Post-2011 era ==
In the aftermath of the 2011 civil war and amid subsequent political and administrative divisions, the Office of the Attorney General, based in the capital Tripoli, emerged as one of the few judicial institutions that maintained a degree of cohesion and continuity.

Nevertheless, its effective authority has faced implementation challenges in certain regions outside the control of the Government of National Unity in Tripoli. This is primarily due to the ongoing political and administrative fragmentation in Libya since 2014.

== See also ==
- Al-Siddiq Al-Sour
- Ministry of Justice (Libya)
