= Ethiopia–Sudan border =

International border

Ethiopia-Sudan border relations
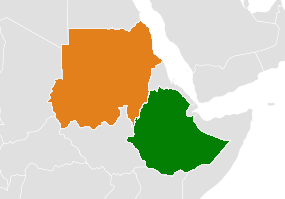

- Ethiopia: Sudan
Ethiopia–Sudan border since 2011

Characteristics
- Length: 744 kilometres (462 mi)

History
- Established: 1902 (British empire)
- Disestablished: 1972 (Ethiopia-Sudan negotiations); Failed to settle the question of the Baro salient
- Treaties: Anglo-Ethiopian Treaty of 1902
- Notes: 1972 Ethiopia–Sudan negotiations

The Ethiopia–Sudan border (Arabic: الحدود الإثيوبية السودانية; Amharic: የኢትዮ ሱዳን ድንበር, romanized: ye’ītiyo sudani diniberi) is a disputed border between the Federal Republic of Ethiopia and the Republic of the Sudan since the 19th century. Ethiopia and Sudan share a long boundary of 744 km (462 mi) in length. The Ethiopian-Sudan border was not settled during the colonial period and was not clear since it mainly relies on natural landmarks such as mountains, trees, and rivers.

One of the most disputed areas is the fertile agricultural region of al-Fashaga, where Ethiopia claims the land up to the Atbarah and Tekezé River while Sudan claims the border is further east.

== History ==
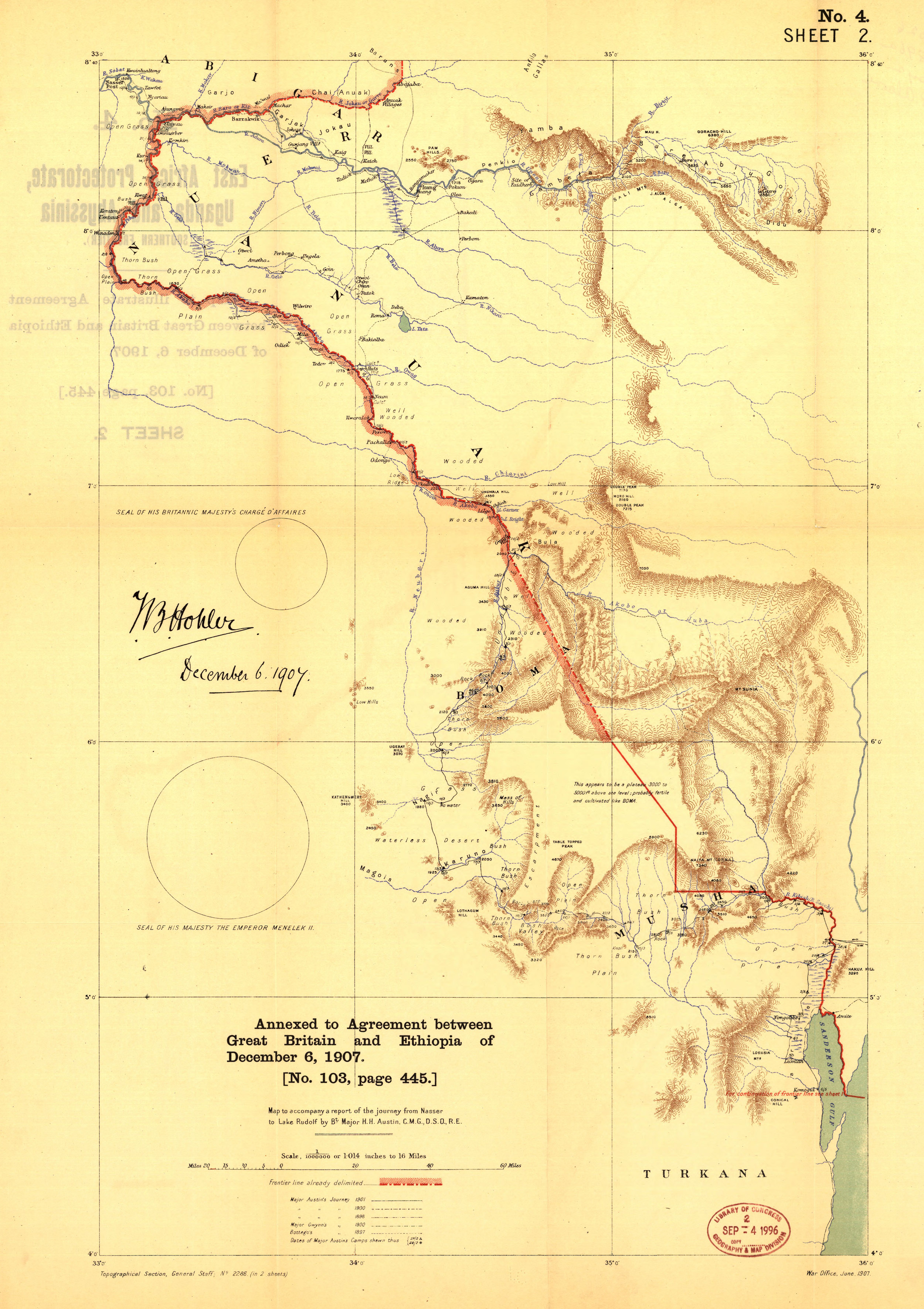
Southeastern delimitation of the border in 1907

On 15 April 1891, Ethiopian Emperor Menelik II sent a letter to European heads of state which defined the actual boundaries of his empire as well as what he considered his area of influence. The letter stated that the northwestern border of Abyssinia extends from the city of Tomat, located at the confluence of the Setit and Atbara Rivers, to Karakouj on the Blue Nile, and includes the Al Qadarif district. Menelik announced his intention to restore his old borders, which extended west to Khartoum and south to Lake Victoria.

It appears that Menelik's circular did not reach Queen Victoria, and the British government only learned of it during Rennell Rodd's expedition in 1897 to discuss some issues with Menelik.

When Sudan was under the colonial rule of the British Empire, there was no clear border demarcation between Ethiopia and Sudan. But in the 1902 Anglo-Ethiopian Treaty, while Sudan was still under British rule, the British Empire demarcated a border by the help of Charles Gwynn, British royal engineer, without the presence of the Ethiopian Empire.

In 1956, when Ethiopia was under the rule of Haile Selassie, Sudan achieved independence from British colonial rule. However, peace was not achieved, since the Government of Sudan supported the armed groups, the Eritrean Liberation Front and Eritrean People's Liberation Front, along the Ethiopia–Sudan border that fought against Haile Selassie's government. Following this, the Imperial government of Ethiopia felt obligated to support the rebel movement in South Sudan known as Anya Nya. This caused the first civil war which took place between 1955 and 1972.

On 17 February 1972 Ethiopia hosted a peace conference in Addis Ababa, between South Sudanese rebels and Sudan. This put an end to the First Sudanese Civil War and reestablished good relations.

In 1972 Sudan and Ethiopia exchanged notes concerning their boundary problems. However, "an exchange of notes between Ethiopia and Sudan failed to settle the question of the Baro salient or make arrangements to stop banditry and establish peaceful coexistence among the pastoral people". The 1972 Ethiopia-Sudan negotiations "fell short of a viable long-term solution inasmuch as it did not redefine where the boundary should run over the Baro salient".

On 15 December 2020 a controversial border dispute caused a violent border clash in the al-Fashaga area.
