= Al-Fashaga conflict =

Conflict on Ethiopia–Sudanese border, 2020–2022

al-Fashaga conflict
- Part of Conflicts in the Horn of Africa, Sudanese civil war, Ethiopian civil conflict (2018–present)
- The al-Fashaga areas
Date	15 December 2020 – 1 December 2022 (1 year, 11 months, 2 weeks and 2 days)
Location	Al-Fashaga District, Qadarif State, near the Ethiopia–Sudan border
Result	Sudanese victory; Disengagement and de-escalation; Sudan recaptures all of the border territory with Ethiopia.; Sudan and Ethiopia agree to settle all disputes peacefully.

Belligerents
Sudan	(Amhara Region) Amhara militias Alleged: Ethiopia; Eritrea

Commanders and leaders
(Sudan) Abdel Fattah al-Burhan (Sudan) Walid Ahmad al-Sajjan (Sudan) Bahaa El-Din Youssef (POW)	Unknown

Strength
(Sudan) 6,000	Unknown

Casualties and losses
97 servicemen killed 17 captured 1 Mil Mi-24 lost	Unknown killed 53 captured
- At least 11 civilians killed (Sudanese claim)

The al-Fashaga conflict was a territorial conflict between Sudan and ethnic Amhara militants from Ethiopia in the disputed Al-Fashaga District (an area of Sudan east of the Atbarah River and south of the Tekezé River). Since 2008, Ethiopia dropped all claims to the al-Fashaga as long as Sudan allowed Ethiopian farmers and militants to stay in the area undisturbed. Following the outbreak of the Tigray War, Sudanese forces were able to move into the region due to an agreement with Ethiopia just three days before. When Amhara militants left to assist the federal government in the war, Sudanese forces started to drive out Ethiopian farmers, effectively breaking the 2008 compromise. Ethiopia also accused Sudan of killing Ethiopian farmers.

The Sudanese government claimed the involvement of Ethiopian National Defense Force (ENDF) and Eritrean troops in the border dispute while the Ethiopian government denied this and regarded the conflict as skirmishes between Sudanese forces and ethnic militias from the Amhara region. External media coverage tended to conflate the Amhara militias with federal soldiers from the Ethiopian military. There is some evidence to suggest that the ENDF was involved in the conflict, although the capacity in which they operated is still unclear. It is likely that they had a peripheral role in the actual fighting.

In 2007, Sudan and Ethiopia signed a treaty which will allow Ethiopian farmers to stay in al-Fashaga and keep cultivate the land. After more than a decade which the treaty remain, in 2020, when the Tigray war broke, Sudan’s army took advantage of the fact that Amhara militiamen and Ethiopian military were deployed north as result, and broke the treaty by advancing into al-Fashaga militarily and expelling thousands of Ethiopian farmers from the disputed territory.

== Background ==
In 1902, British-ruled Sudan and the Ethiopian Empire signed a treaty to properly demarcate the border, but it failed, as some areas along the border were left unresolved. In both the 1902 and a later 1907 treaty, the international boundary runs to the east, which means the land of al-Fashaga is Sudanese but Ethiopians had already settled the area and had been cultivating there, along with paying taxes to the Ethiopian government.

Location of al-Fashaga, Sudan

After the Eritrean–Ethiopian War, Ethiopia and Sudan began long-dormant talks to settle the exact location of their 744 km-long (462 miles) border, with the most difficult area to agree on being the al-Fashaga region.

In 2008, they reached a compromise. Ethiopia agreed to the al-Fashaga region being a part of Sudan but Amhara farmers would still be allowed to continue living there undisturbed. Tigrayan farmers in the northern regions of al-Fashaga were also allowed to stay.

Once the Tigray People's Liberation Front (TPLF) was removed from power in 2018, Amhara Region-leaders, whose sub-national territory al-Fashaga borders, condemned the deal as a secret bargain and said they were not properly consulted when the deal was made.

== Prelude ==
At the start of the Tigray war, the head of Sudan's ruling Sovereign Council, Lt. General Abdel Fattah, dispatched over 6,000 soldiers to the Ethiopian border as part of an agreement reached with Ethiopia on 1 November 2020 to prevent Tigrayan rebels from using Sudan as a supply route. With Sudanese troops finally being deployed to the border, the 2008 compromise was practically dissolved, and once Amhara militants were re-deployed to Tigray to help the federal government, Sudanese soldiers allegedly began removing potentially thousands of Amhara and Tigrayan farmers from the region. Complicating matters further was a rapid exodus of refugees fleeing to Sudan from the Tigray Region's Western Zone, many of them attempting to escape the wartime violence. The number of refugees increased from around 7,000 on 11 November to almost 44,000 by the end of the month.

Sudanese troops made rapid progress in consolidating their hold on the disputed territory. On 2 December, the Sudanese Armed Forces occupied the Khor Yabis area, controlled by Ethiopia for twenty-five years, expelling Ethiopian militants without a fight. Three days later, Sudan deployed the Sixth Infantry Division to al-Fashaga to take control of Jebel Tayara, in Gallabat. Sudan also continued to penetrate deeper into al-Fashaga by the second week of December.

== Clashes ==
=== 2020 ===
On 15 December, Ethiopian militants, allegedly backed by the Ethiopian government, ambushed several Sudanese troops, killing an officer and three soldiers. Later that day, the Sudanese Prime Minister, Abdalla Hamdok, said that the armed forces of Sudan were prepared to repel the military aggression. Already dealing with a war in the north, Ethiopian Prime Minister Abiy Ahmed tried to calm the situation by tweeting, "Such incidents will not break the bond b/n our two countries as we always use dialogue to resolve issues."

Tensions increased when Sudan started mobilising soldiers to the contested border and by New Year's day, it claimed to have recaptured all villages in the region. In response, Ethiopian military chief General Birhanu Jula Gelalcha said, "Our military is engaged elsewhere, they took advantage of that. This should have been solved amicably. Sudan needs to choose dialogue, as there are third party actors who want to see our countries divided."

On 28 December, Sudan claimed to have captured the villages of Asmaro, Lebbaki, Pasha, Lamlam, Melkamo, Males, Ashkar, Arqa, and Umm Pasha Teddy. In total, it captured eleven settlements that Ethiopian militias had been controlling. Sudan also claimed to have captured the town of Lilli from Amhara forces and militias. Lilli is home to Amhara militia commanders, major traders and farmers. In total, over a thousand Ethiopian farmers live there.

=== 2021 ===
On 3 January, Sudan captured 45 Amhara militiamen who had crossed into Sudan.

Subsequently, Ethiopian militiamen kidnapped three Sudanese merchants from the Basanda area of El-Gadarif state on 30 January, after penetrating seven kilometres inside Sudanese territory, and set their motorcycle on fire. The Sudanese military deployed additional reinforcements after the kidnapping. Armed relatives of the abductees tried to enter the Ethiopian town of Metemma but were persuaded to withdraw. The merchants were later released after payment of a ransom.

On 14 February, Sudan said Ethiopian soldiers crossed into its territory. The Ethiopian Ministry of Foreign Affairs said that Sudan had been plundering and displacing Ethiopian citizens since 6 November 2020 and that the Sudanese army should evacuate the area that it had forcefully occupied. Ethiopia also accused Sudan of crossing into its territory.

On 20 February, the Sudanese Ministry of Foreign Affairs claimed that Eritrean forces had entered into the al-Fashaga region with Ethiopian forces. Four days later, on 24 February, Eritrea denied the involvement of its forces in the tensions on the Sudanese-Ethiopian border, stating that it wished for a peaceful solution to the conflict and that the government understood Sudan's position regarding its right to extend its sovereignty.

On 23 February, Ethiopia asked Sudan to withdraw its troops from the disputed border area before peace talks could begin. The Ethiopian Ministry of Foreign Affairs spokesperson, Dina Mufti, said that Ethiopia did not want to enter into conflict with Sudan again. He also said that Ethiopia wished to return to the 2008 compromise, which would allow Ethiopian troops and civilians to enter the region undisturbed. Finally, Mufti said there was a third party who pushed Sudan to enter into conflict with Ethiopia. The same day, Sudan stated that it would not withdraw its troops from the border region and that the deployment of the Sudanese army on the border strip with Ethiopia was a final and irreversible decision.

On 2 March, the Sudanese army continued to push into the last Ethiopian stronghold of Bereket in the disputed border region of al-Fashaga, against Ethiopian-backed forces. In the meantime, Sudan claimed Eritrean forces were helping the Ethiopians.

Sudan closed the Gallabat-Metemma border crossing with Ethiopia on 3 April, two days after Ethiopian militias attacked Sudanese customs officials in the presence of the Ethiopian military. Walid Ahmad al-Sajjan, commander of the Fifth Brigade of the Sudanese Armed Forces in Umm Barakit, stated on 8 April that the Sudanese military had retaken 95% of the disputed al-Fashaga region from Ethiopia.

On 13 April, 62 prisoners (53 Ethiopians and 9 Sudanese) were exchanged between Sudan and Ethiopia through the Gallabat border crossing in an atmosphere of "positive cooperation and coordination between the two sides".

Three children of the Fellata tribe were kidnapped by Ethiopian militias from an area near Gallabat and Metemma on 23 July. Sudanese captain Bahaa El-Din Youssef, commander of the Gallabat Military Region, was captured and later tortured while pursuing the militia behind the kidnapping. Meanwhile, the military buildup continued on the border and Sudan closed the Gallabat border crossing with Ethiopia on 24 July.

Sudan's military stated on 26 September that Ethiopian forces had tried to capture the Umm Barakit area a day earlier but were forced to withdraw after being confronted.

On 27 November 2021, six Sudanese soldiers were killed in an attack by Ethiopian forces on a Sudanese army post near the border between the countries, Sudanese military sources told Reuters. Sudan's army said in an earlier statement on Facebook that "groups of the Ethiopian army and militias attacked its forces in al-Fashaga Al-sughra, which resulted in deaths... our forces valiantly repelled the attack and inflicted heavy losses in lives and equipment on the attackers."

On 15 December 2021, the Sudanese forces announced full control over the disputed region.

=== 2022 ===
On 27 June 2022, the Sudanese government accused Ethiopia of executing seven Sudanese soldiers and a civilian and then displaying the bodies of those executed to the public. However, the Ethiopian government denied this and claimed that the deaths were the result of a skirmish between Sudanese soldiers and a local militia.

On 24 August 2022, the Ethiopian Air Force shot down a plane carrying weapons that they suspected to be destined for the Tigray People's Liberation Front. According to senior officials, the EAF shot it down while it was crossing the Ethiopia–Sudan border. Major General Tesfaye Ayelew, quoted by the Ethiopian News Agency, said that the plane "violated our airspace from Sudan... and aimed to supply weapons to the terror group, was shot down by our heroic air force". Sudanese army spokesperson Nabil Abdallah stated by phone that Sudan was not involved in the incident. Ethiopian national security advisor Redwan Hussein stated that "the military explained that a plane belonging to historical enemies of our country, who are known for their incessant desire to weaken our country, was shot down."

=== 2025 ===
On 4 July 2025, senior Sudanese government officials accused Ethiopia of exploiting Sudan’s ongoing civil war by sending militias backed by the Ethiopian army into the Al-Fashqa, where they blocked local farmers from accessing their fields and began clearing land under military protection. Mubarak Al-Nour, vice-president of the Eastern Sudan Coordination Committee and former regional parliamentarian, reported that these forces had expelled Sudanese farmers and operated with the explicit support of Ethiopian regular troops, taking advantage of a security vacuum created when Sudanese units were redeployed to other battlefronts. Sudan had reclaimed much of Al-Fashqa in 2020 after two decades of occupation by Ethiopian settlers, but that recent withdrawals of Sudanese military positions have allowed new incursions. In a further sign of instability, traders in the border town of Al-Qalabat reported that an armed Ethiopian group crossed into Sudan, looted a livestock market and then withdrew back across the frontier.

== Reactions ==
=== International ===
- Saudi Arabia offered to help reconcile the feuding parties.
- (United Kingdom) British Foreign Secretary Dominic Raab met with officials from both sides and urged them to end their fighting and seek common ground.

=== Intergovernmental organizations ===
- (European Union) (Finland) Special European Envoy and Finnish Foreign Minister Pekka Haavisto met with Sudanese officials in Khartoum to help reduce tensions between Sudan and Ethiopia. He also met with Ethiopian officials later.

== Aftermath ==
According to an April 2023 report by the newspaper Al-Sudani, the Sudanese Armed Forces (SAF) repelled an invasion by the Ethiopian armed forces in the al-Fashaqa District. They reported that the Ethiopian army had carried out an attack with tanks, armoured vehicles, and infantry and that the SAF had inflicted heavy losses on Ethiopian personnel and equipment. According to Al-Sudani, the SAF said that it was monitoring "unusual activity among the Ethiopian forces" since the start of hostilities with the Rapid Support Forces (RSF), and that Ethiopian forces were carrying out intensive reconnaissance and surveillance operations along the border. However, Ethiopian Prime Minister Abiy Ahmed denied that clashes had occurred, and claimed that some parties were spreading false allegations to incite conflict and jeopardize ties between Ethiopia and Sudan.
