= RADA Special Deterrence Forces =

Military unit in Libya

Al Radaa for Countering Terrorism & Organized Crime
- جهاز الردع لمكافحة الارهاب والجريمة المنظمة
- Founded: approx. 2012 (14 years ago) by Abdul Rauf Kara
- Country: Libya
- Allegiance: Presidential Council and Abdulrauf Kara
- Branch: Ministry of Internal Affairs
- Type: Islamic Paramilitary Special Forces
- Role: SWAT / Militarized Police Ops / Counter Terrorism Intelligence
- Size: 5000-15000
- Part of: Ministry of Interior
- Garrison/HQ: Mitiga Airbase
- Nickname: Rada
- Engagements: Operation Flood of Dignity 2019, 2 day war 2025 against the 444th brigade
- Website: RADA Deterrence Forces on Facebook

Commanders
- Leadership: Abdul Raouf Kara

State of Libya Al Radaa for Countering Terrorism & Organized Crime (Arabic: دولة ليبيا جهاز الردع لمكافحة الارهاب والجريمة المنظمة), commonly known as RADA Special Deterrence Forces, or simply RADA, is a Madkhali Islamic special operations military police unit formed in Tripoli, Libya, for the purpose of tackling crime. Its focus is high-profile kidnappings, murders, drug and alcohol poisoning related deaths, illegal migrant smuggling, weapons smuggling, explosives smuggling, terrorist attacks and plots. A lack of political power and police presence in Tripoli provoked the founding of this special unit.

The leader is Abdul Raouf Kara.

== History ==
RADA was originally a fighting unit that helped topple Muammar Gaddafi in the 2011 civil war. After Gaddafi, Abdul Rauf Kara was a member of the police force formed by the Supreme Security Committee with a reported 700 men at his disposal. The Supreme Security Committee (SSC) was then dissolved into the Ministry of Internal Affairs of Libya where his forces were then relabeled as RADA Special Deterrence forces under the guidance of the Ministry of Interior.

=== Size and composition ===
The group has between 5000 to 15000 members. It is the largest state funded militia in Tripoli. Their main areas of operations start from the gate of Tajura going west until the Zawiyat al Dahmani neighborhood, sometimes they do patrol the city center. Their headquarters are at Mitiga Airbase.

== Operations ==
RADA operates as an independent department under the Ministry of Interior, and implements a focused anti-narcotics and police force mandate. RADA Special Forces are involved in police work, investigations, arrests, patrols, checkpoints, and other anti-crime activities. This organization actively and publicly releases images and online footage displaying the seizure of explosives and components smuggled by terrorists, unregulated alcohol seizures, unregulated medical goods such as Tramadol, dollar-dinar black market arrests, arrests of terrorism and terrorist suspects, arrests of kidnappers and other criminals, seizing illegal contraband, etc.

RADA operates primarily within Tripoli, but they do perform patrols outside of it since they have close relations with other militias in the west.

RADA operates under Islamic Sharia principles with "accordance to" post Gaddafi-era laws reformed under controversial circumstances by the Islamic Supreme court of Tripoli. Legal and political reforms were made during the coup d'état against the house of representatives in the 2013–14 battle of Tripoli by "Libya Dawn".

As an example, in August 2017, one of Libya's most notorious human and fuel smugglers Fahmi Salim Bin Khalifa was captured as ordered by the Attorney General's Office and praised by the state owned National Oil Corporation. The move is notable due to Libya's 2013–2017 security vacuum and governance crisis.
