= Al-Fashaga District =

Disputed territory between Al Qadarif state, Sudan, and Amhara Region, Ethiopia

Al Fushqa/Al Fashaga
- Disputed territory
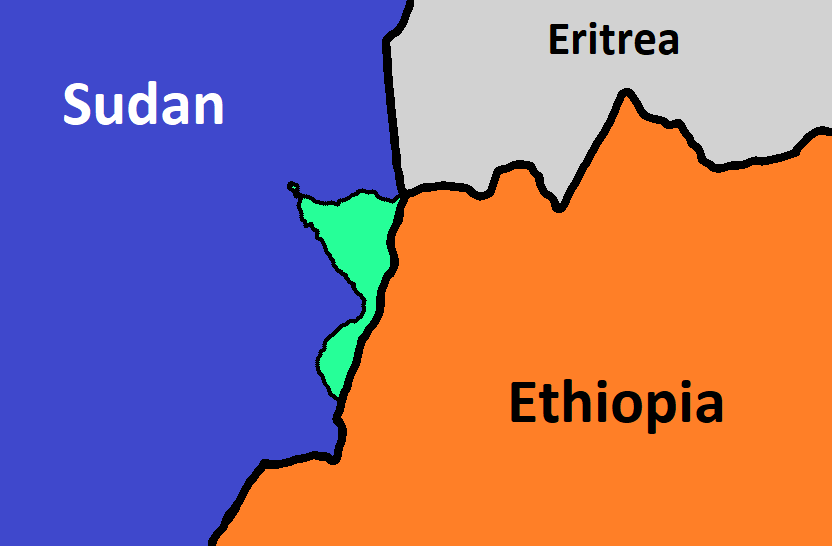
- The Al Fashaga triangle (light green), near the tripoint of the borders of Sudan (blue), Ethiopia (orange), and Eritrea (grey)
- Country: Disputed area between: Sudan; Ethiopia
- State: Al Qadarif: Al Fushqa District
- Region: Amhara

The Al Fushqa or Al Fashaga district (Arabic: الفشقة, Amharic: አል ፋሻጋ) also known as the (Al) Fashaga (border) triangle is a disputed area between Ethiopia and Sudan, specifically Al Qadarif and Amhara. The region is a fertile agricultural land and its capital is Showak.

== History ==
Al Fashaga is located on the Ethiopia–Sudan border, and is claimed by both Sudan and Ethiopia. The region had historically been administered by the Ethiopian Empire. However, in 1902, Emperor Menelik II ceded the region to the British, who incorporated it into Anglo-Egyptian Sudan. Ethiopia never signed a treaty with Sudan over the territory, because the government argued that the region came under Ethiopian control when Sudan was freed in 1956. In the mid 1990s, Ethiopians, mostly from the Amhara people, moved into the Al Fashaga region to begin farming due to the high fertility of the land. Under Egyptian and Ethiopian pressure, the Sudanese Armed Forces withdrew from region in 1995 as well as the Halaib Triangle following an assassination attempt against Egyptian president Hosni Mubarak in Ethiopia. Sudanese President Omar al-Bashir was accused of supporting the Egyptian Islamic Jihad group behind the attempt.

Under a compromise reached in 2008, Ethiopian farmers cultivated the land while Sudan retained administrative control of it. This compromise ended in November 2020, when the Tigray War began and Sudan expelled Ethiopian farmers, resulting in border clashes between the two countries. On 2 December, the Sudanese Armed Forces occupied the Khor Yabis area, controlled by Ethiopia for 25 years, expelling Ethiopian militants without a fight.

During the Sudanese civil war (2023–present), the Sudanese government claimed to have repelled an Ethiopian incursion on the Al Fashaga region on 19 April. Ethiopian Prime Minister Abiy Ahmed denied any assault ever took place. On 4 July 2025, Ethiopian militias attacked Sudanese farmers in the area.
