= Ministry of Interior (Libya) =

Ministry of Internal Affairs
- وزارة الداخلية الليبية

Agency overview
- Formed: 2011
- Preceding agency: General People's Committee of Public Security (1977–2011)
- Jurisdiction: Government of Libya
- Minister responsible: Khalid Mazen, Interior Minister
- Website: moi.gov.ly

The Ministry of Internal Affairs of Libya (وزارة الداخلية الليبية) is the interior ministry of Libya. The Ministry is headquartered in Tripoli.

== General People's Committee for Public Security ==
This general people's committee fulfilled the function of an interior ministry during Muammar Gaddafi's rule after 1969.

Malta delivered €7,936,000 of what were described as 'non-military items' to Libya in 2009. There was a mistake in original reports which gave the value as €79 million. Despite being marked as 'non-military items,' the shipment comprised 1,800 Benelli 12 gauge shotguns, 7,500 semi-automatic Beretta Px4 Storm pistols, and 1,900 cal 9xI9mm Beretta Cx4 Storm semi-automatic carbines. They were destined for the General People's Committee for Public Security, effectively Libya's Ministry of the Interior.

== Structure ==
=== Supreme Security Committee ===
The Supreme Security Committee (SSC) was created by Order No. 20 of the National Transitional Council in October 2011 to provide a new revolutionary security apparatus to fill the security vacuum in the capital of Tripoli after the fall of Gaddafi. The order gave the SSC the task of providing security in the capital and charged it with the protection of state property, embassies and private property, as well as the creation of the appropriate security conditions that would contribute to the return to normal life. The Committee hired revolutionary fighters as the initial personnel.

After the formation of the transitional government the National Transitional Council transferred dependency of the Supreme Security Committee administratively and financially to the Interior Ministry. The SSC was restructured under the name of (the Supreme Security Committee temporary) and identified have a range of disciplines, and in view of what the commission has achieved the desired goals, was authorized by the ministry to open branches in all Libyan cities to establish security in the entire country.

==== Organizational structure ====
- Management of public affairs
- Information Security Management
- Operations Management
- Technical Affairs Department
- the Department of Legal Affairs
- Public Information Office
- Office of Inspection

=== National Police ===
  - Department on behalf of the fight against drugs.
  - Dept. on behalf of the fight against economic crimes.
  - Dept. on behalf of illegal immigration.
